= List of mantis genera and species =

The following list of mantis genera and species is based on the "Mantodea Species File", which is the primary reference for the taxonomy shown here.

The insect order Mantodea consists of over 2,400 species of mantises in about 460 genera. 75 of these genera are in the family Mantidae (the mantids), which formerly was the sole family recognized within the order.

In some cases, common names in the English language are loosely applied to several different members of a particular genus, or even for species in various genera. For example, "giant Asian mantis" is used for various members of Hierodula, "dead leaf mantis" may refer not only to various species of Deroplatys, but to all brown mantises that use leaf mimicry for camouflage. "flower mantis" refers to numerous mantises, especially those belonging to or similar to those of genus Creobroter, and so on.

---For citation of common nomenclature and additional references, see individual articles.

== Genus Acanthops ==
Some members of this genus are known as dead leaf mantises or boxer mantises.

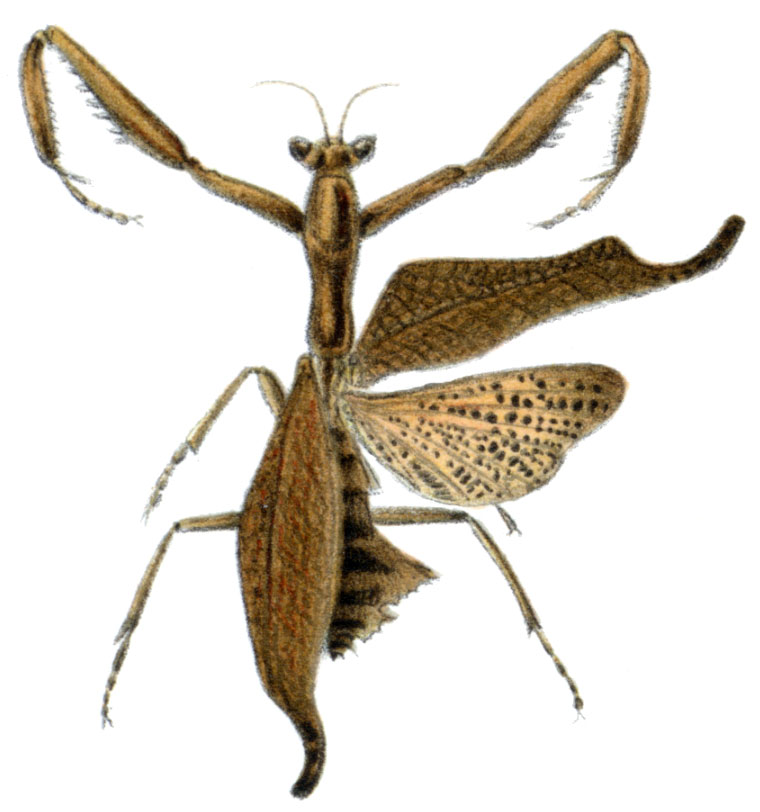
Adult female Acanthops falcataria

- Acanthops bidens
- Acanthops boliviana
- Acanthops brunneri
- Acanthops centralis
- Acanthops coloradensis
- Acanthops contorta
- Acanthops elegans
- Acanthops erosa
- Acanthops erosula
- Acanthops falcata
- Acanthops falcataria
- Acanthops fuscifolia
- Acanthops godmani
- Acanthops occidentalis
- Acanthops onorei
- Acanthops parafalcata
- Acanthops parva
- Acanthops royi
- Acanthops soukana

== Genus Achlaena ==
- Achlaena grandis

== Genus Achlaenella ==
- Achlaenella adolphifrederici

== Genus Acithespis ==
- Acithespis gigas

== Genus Acontista ==
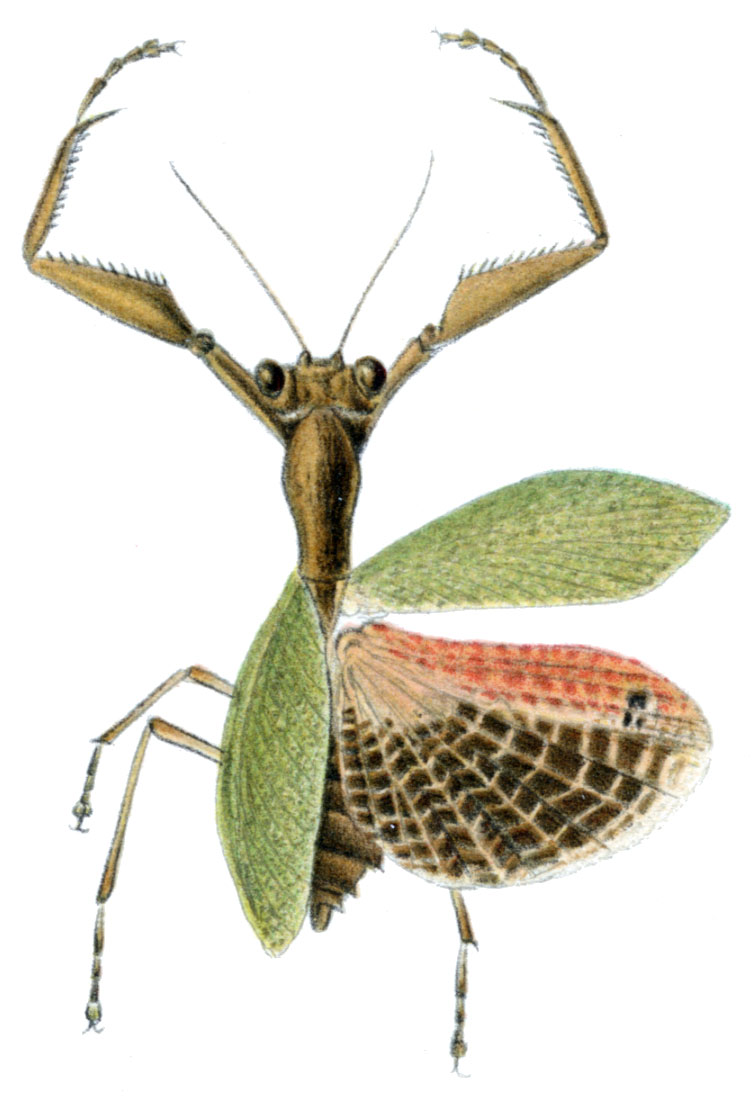
Acontista concinna

- Acontista amazonica
- Acontista amoenula
- Acontista aurantiaca
- Acontista bolivari
- Acontista brevipennis
- Acontista cayennensis
- Acontista championi
- Acontista chopardi
- Acontista concinna
- Acontista cordillerae
- Acontista cubana
- Acontista ecuadorica
- Acontista eximia
- Acontista festae
- Acontista fraterna
- Acontista gracilis
- Acontista inquinata
- Acontista iriodes
- Acontista maroniensis
- Acontista mexicana
- Acontista minima
- Acontista multicolor
- Acontista parva
- Acontista piracicabensis
- Acontista rehni
- Acontista semirufa
- Acontista vitrea

== Genus Acromantis ==
Some species within this genus are known as boxer mantises or flower mantises.

- Acromantis australis
- Acromantis dyaka
- Acromantis elegans
- Acromantis formosana (Taiwan flower mantis)
- Acromantis gestri (Thai boxer mantis, Sumatran Acromantis)
- Acromantis grandis
- Acromantis hesione
- Acromantis indica
- Acromantis insularis
- Acromantis japonica (Japanese boxer mantis)
- Acromantis lilii
- Acromantis luzonica
- Acromantis montana
- Acromantis moultoni
- Acromantis nicobarica
- Acromantis oligoneura
- Acromantis palauana
- Acromantis philippina
- Acromantis satsumensis
- Acromantis siporana

== Genus Aetaella ==
- Aetaella bakeri
- Aetaella pluvisilvae

== Genus Aethalochroa ==
Members of this genus are commonly called stick mantises.

- Aethalochroa affinis
- Aethalochroa ashmoliana (Iranian stick mantis)
- Aethalochroa indica
- Aethalochroa insignis (Indian stick mantis)
- Aethalochroa simplicipes
- Aethalochroa spinipes

== Genus Afrothespis ==
- Afrothespis kenyana
- Afrothespis rhodesiaca

== Genus Agrionopsis ==
- Agrionopsis bacilliformis
- Agrionopsis brachyptera
- Agrionopsis congica
- Agrionopsis distanti
- Agrionopsis modesta

== Genus Alalomantis ==
- Alalomantis coxalis
- Alalomantis muta (Cameroon mantis)

== Genus Alangularis ==
- Alangularis multilobata

== Genus Amantis ==
- Amantis aeta
- Amantis aliena
- Amantis basilana
- Amantis biroi
- Amantis bolivari
- Amantis fuliginosa
- Amantis fumosana
- Amantis gestri
- Amantis hainanensis
- Amantis indica
- Amantis irina
- Amantis lofaoshanensis
- Amantis longipennis
- Amantis malayana
- Amantis nawai
- Amantis philippina
- Amantis reticulata
- Amantis saussurei
- Amantis subirina
- Amantis testacea
- Amantis tristis
- Amantis vitalisi

== Genus †Ambermantis ==
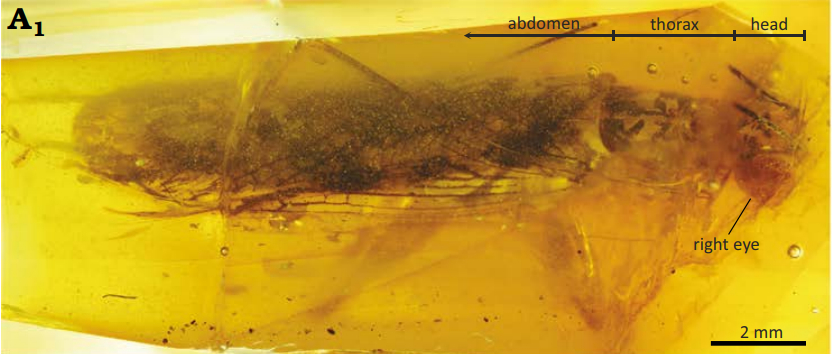
Ambermantis wozniaki holotype male

- †Ambermantis wozniaki

== Genus Ambivia ==
- Ambivia parapopa
- Ambivia popa

== Genus Ameles ==
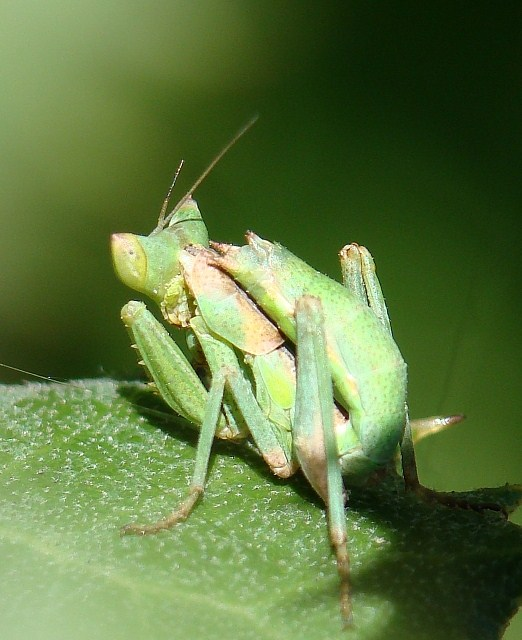
Ameles spallanzania, the European dwarf mantis

- Ameles abjecta
- Ameles aegyptiaca
- Ameles africana
- Ameles arabica
- Ameles assoi
- Ameles crassinervis
- Ameles decolor
- Ameles dumonti
- †Ameles fasciipennis
- Ameles gracilis
- Ameles heldreichi
- Ameles kervillei
- Ameles maroccana
- Ameles massai
- Ameles modesta
- Ameles moralesi
- Ameles nana
- Ameles persa
- Ameles picteti
- Ameles poggii
- Ameles soror
- Ameles spallanzania (European dwarf mantis)
- Ameles syriensis
- Ameles wadisirhani

== Genus Amorphoscelis ==
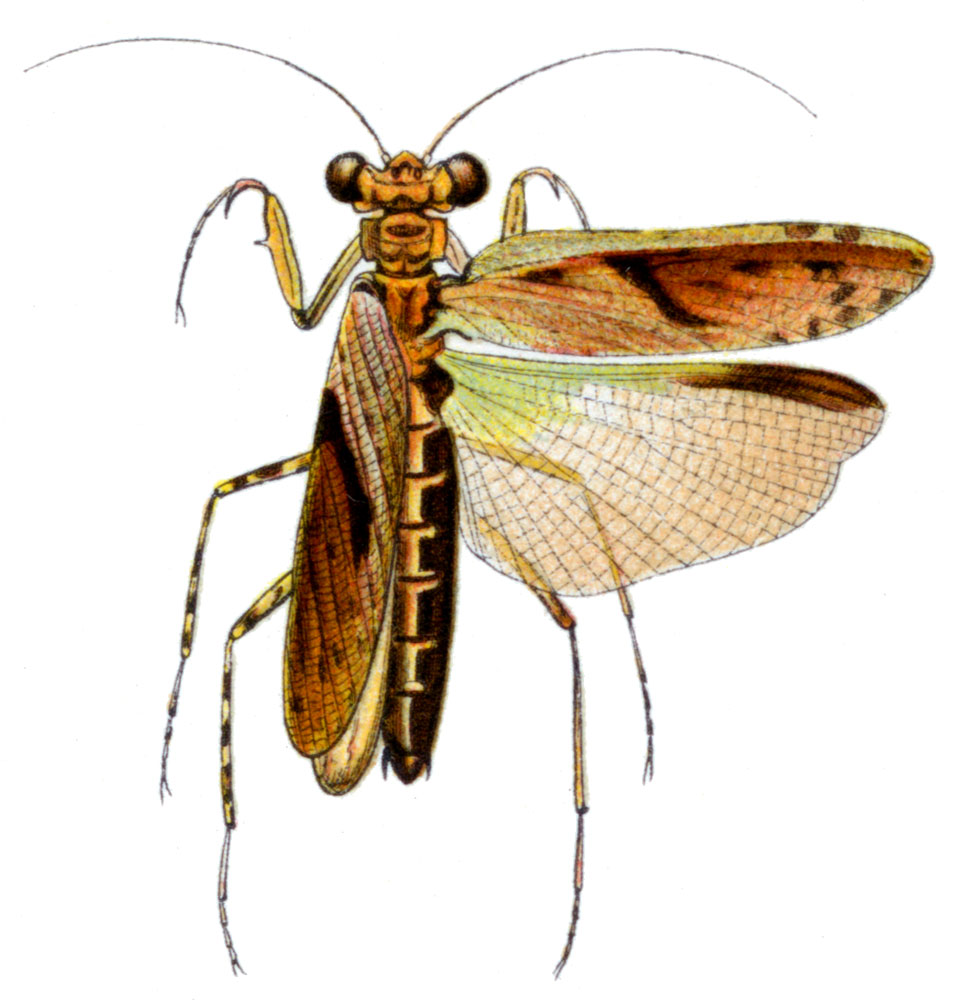
Amorphoscelis elegans

Amorphoscelis species are concentrated in Africa, India, Indonesia, and the Philippines.

- Amorphoscelis abyssinica
- Amorphoscelis angolica
- Amorphoscelis annulicornis
- Amorphoscelis asymmetrica
- Amorphoscelis austrogermanica
- Amorphoscelis bimaculata
- Amorphoscelis borneana
- Amorphoscelis brunneipennis
- Amorphoscelis chinensis
- Amorphoscelis chopardi
- Amorphoscelis elegans
- Amorphoscelis griffini
- Amorphoscelis grisea
- Amorphoscelis hainana
- Amorphoscelis hamata
- Amorphoscelis huismani
- Amorphoscelis javana
- Amorphoscelis kenyensis
- Amorphoscelis lamottei
- Amorphoscelis laxeretis
- Amorphoscelis machadoi
- Amorphoscelis morini
- Amorphoscelis naumanni
- Amorphoscelis nigriventer
- Amorphoscelis nubeculosa
- Amorphoscelis opaca
- Amorphoscelis orientalis
- Amorphoscelis pallida
- Amorphoscelis pantherina
- Amorphoscelis papua
- Amorphoscelis parva
- Amorphoscelis pellucida
- Amorphoscelis phaesoma
- Amorphoscelis philippina
- Amorphoscelis pinheyi
- Amorphoscelis pulchella
- Amorphoscelis pulchra
- Amorphoscelis punctata
- Amorphoscelis reticulata
- Amorphoscelis rufula
- Amorphoscelis siebersi
- Amorphoscelis singaporana
- Amorphoscelis spinosa
- Amorphoscelis stellulatha
- Amorphoscelis subnigra
- Amorphoscelis sulawesiana
- Amorphoscelis sumatrana
- Amorphoscelis tigrina
- Amorphoscelis tuberculata
- Amorphoscelis villiersi

== Genus †Amorphoscelites ==
- †Amorphoscelites sharovi

== Genus Amphecostephanus ==
- Amphecostephanus rex

== Genus Anamiopteryx ==
- Anamiopteryx borellii
- Anamiopteryx grandis
- Anamiopteryx magna
- Anamiopteryx tuberculata

== Genus Anaxarcha ==
- Anaxarcha acuta
- Anaxarcha graminea
- Anaxarcha hyalina
- Anaxarcha intermedia
- Anaxarcha limbata
- Anaxarcha pulchella
- Anaxarcha pulchra
- Anaxarcha sinensis
- Anaxarcha tianmushanensis
- Anaxarcha zhengi

== Genus Angela ==
- Angela armata
- Angela brachyptera
- Angela championi
- Angela decolor
- Angela guianensis (Rehn, 1906)
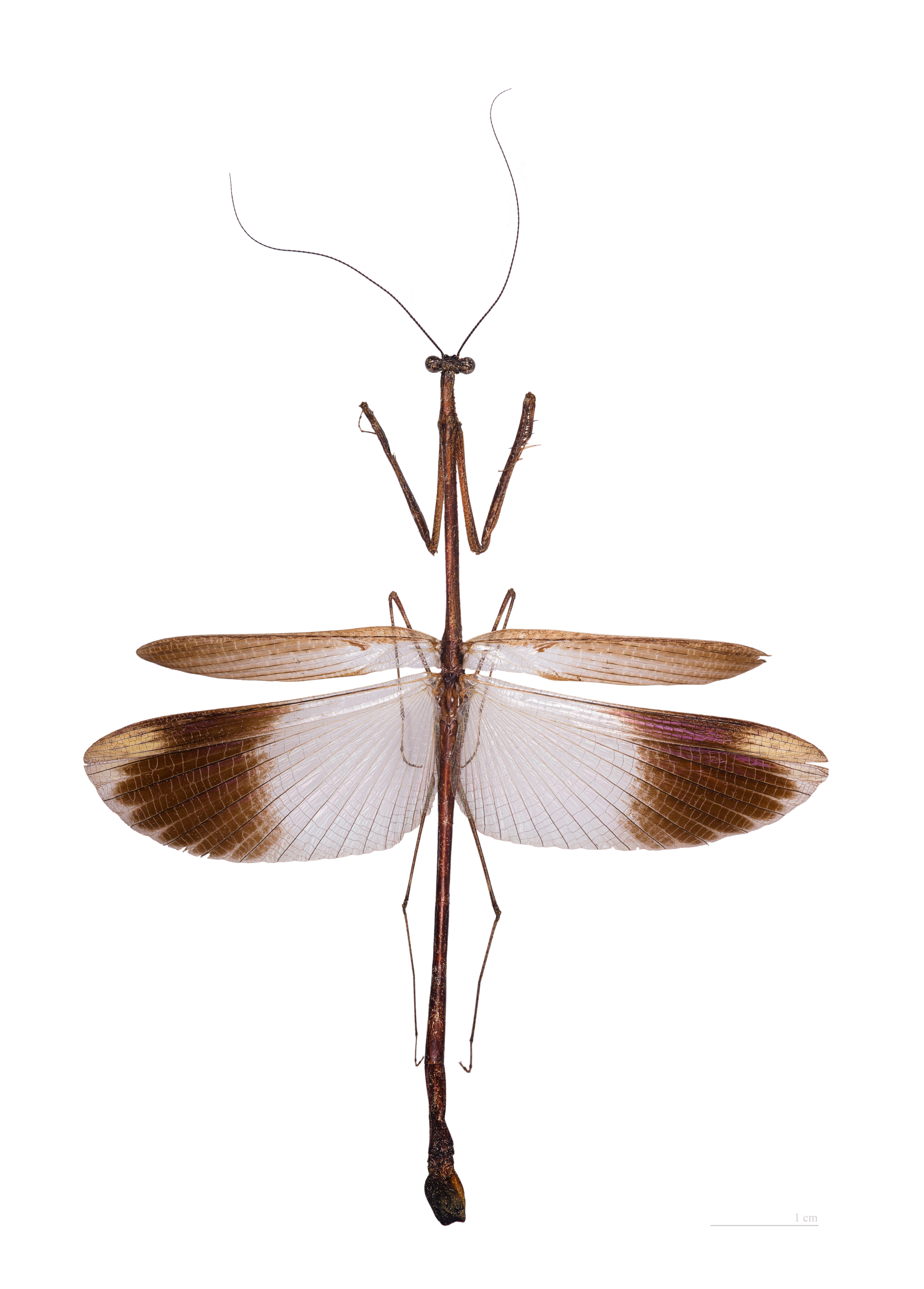
  Angela guianensis
- Angela inermis
- Angela lemoulti
- Angela maxima
- Angela minor
- Angela miranda
- Angela ornata
- Angela perpulchra
- Angela peruviana
- Angela purpurascens
- Angela quinquemaculata
- Angela saussurii
- Angela subhyalina
- Angela trifasciata
- Angela werneri

== Genus Anoplosigerpes ==
- Anoplosigerpes tessmanni

== Genus Antemna ==
- Antemna rapax

== Genus Antistia ==
- Antistia maculipennis
- Antistia parva
- Antistia robusta
- Antistia vicina

== Genus Anasigerpes ==
- Anasigerpes amieti
- Anasigerpes bifasciata
- Anasigerpes centralis
- Anasigerpes grilloti
- Anasigerpes heydeni
- Anasigerpes nigripes
- Anasigerpes trifasciata
- Anasigerpes unifasciata

== Genus Apterocorypha ==
- Apterocorypha atra
- Apterocorypha aurita
- Apterocorypha bispina
- Apterocorypha somalica

== Genus Apteromantis ==
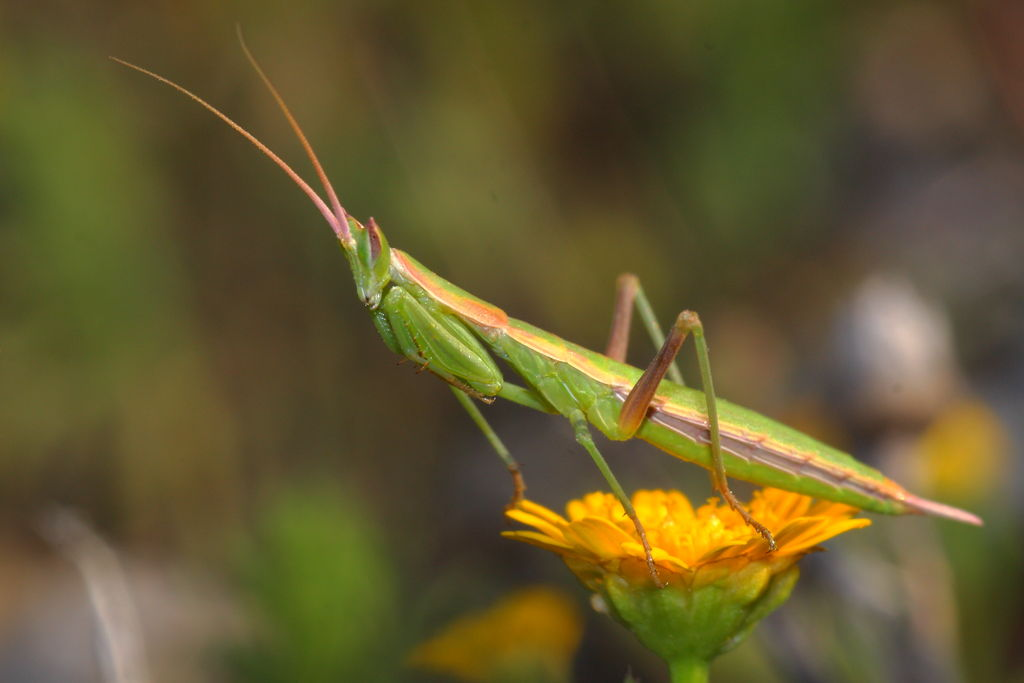
Apteromantis aptera

- Apteromantis aptera
- Apteromantis bolivari

== Genus †Aragonimantis ==
- †Aragonimantis aenigma

== Genus †Archaeophlebia ==
- †Archaeophlebia enigmatica

== Genus Archimantis ==
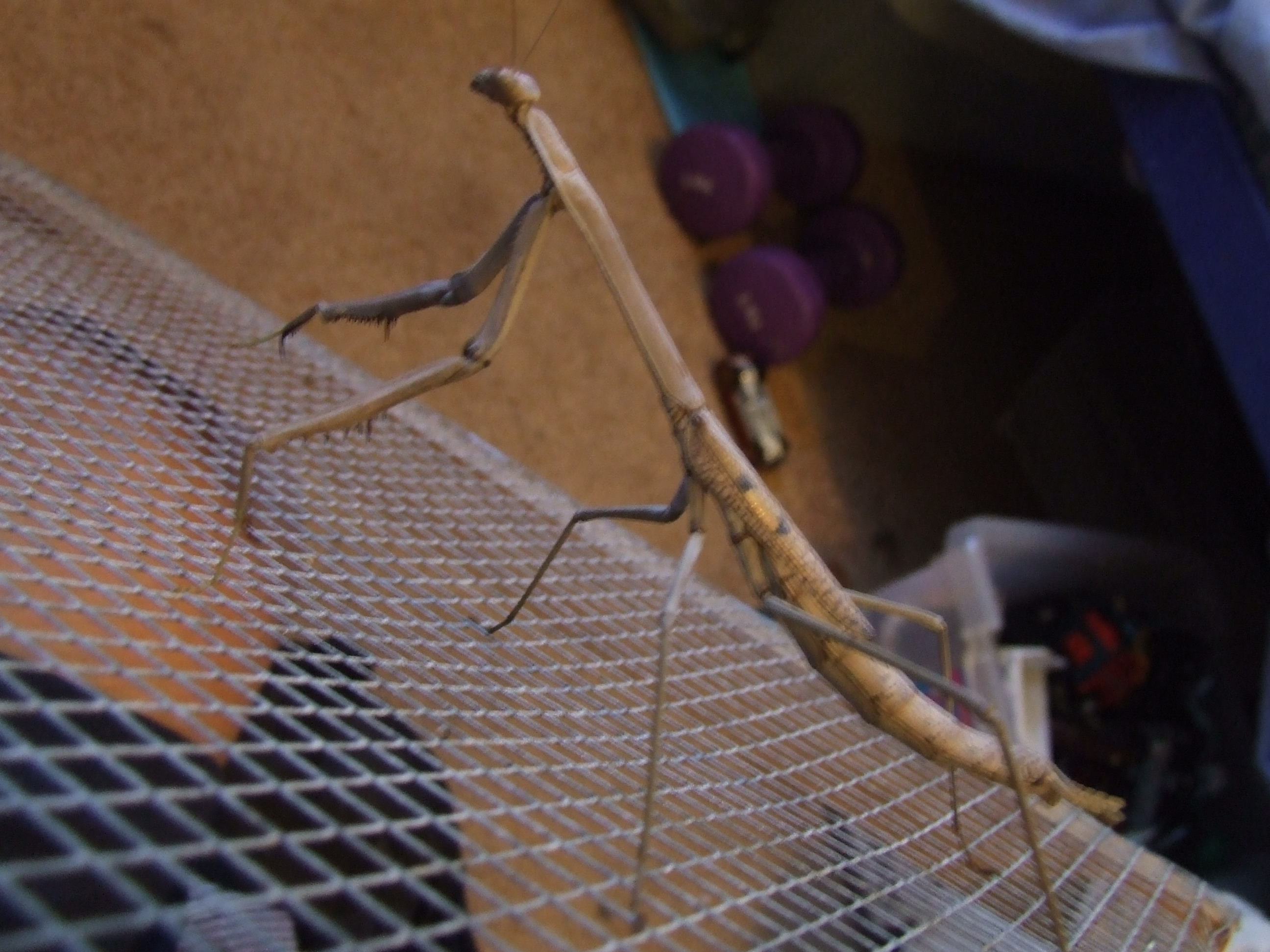
Archimantis monstrosa

Archimantis species are common in Australia. Some are called stick mantises.

- Archimantis armata
- Archimantis brunneriana
- Archimantis gracilis
- Archimantis latistyla (Large brown mantis, Australian stick mantis)
- Archimantis monstrosa (Monster mantis)
- Archimantis quinquelobata (Australian Spikey Stick Mantis)
- Archimantis sobrina
- Archimantis straminea
- Archimantis vittata

== Genus Ariusia ==
Ariusia conspersa

- Ariusia conspersa

== Genus Armene ==
- Armene breviptera
- Armene fanica
- Armene griseolata
- Armene hissarica
- Armene pusilla
- Armene robusta
- Armene silvicola

== Genus Armeniola ==
- Armeniola laevis

== Genus Arria ==
- Arria cinctipes
- Arria leigongshanensis
- Arria meghalayensis
- Arria oreophila
- Arria pallida
- Arria sticta

== Genus †Arvernineura ==
- †Arvernineura insignis

== Genus Asiadodis ==
Members of this genus are common known as shield mantises.

- Asiadodis squilla (Asian shield mantis)
- Asiadodis yunnanensis (Yunnan Shield Mantis)

== Genus Astape ==
Astape denticollis

- Astape denticollis

== Genus Astollia ==
- Astollia chloris

== Genus Astyliasula ==
- Astyliasula basinigra
- Astyliasula hoffmanni
- Astyliasula inermis
- Astyliasula javana
- Astyliasula major
- Astyliasula phyllopus
- Astyliasula sarawaca
- Astyliasula wuyshana

== Genus Austromantis ==
- Austromantis albomarginata

== Genus Austrovates ==
- Austrovates papua
- Austrovates variegata

== Genus † Baissomantis ==
- † Baissomantis maculata Gratshev & Zherikhin, 1994
- † Baissomantis picta Gratshev & Zherikhin, 1994

== Genus Bantia ==
Bantia michaelisi

- Bantia chopardi
- Bantia fusca
- Bantia marmorata
- Bantia metzi
- Bantia michaelisi
- Bantia nana
- Bantia pygmaea
- Bantia simoni
- Bantia werneri
- Bantia yotocoensis

== Genus Bantiella ==
Bantiella fusca

- Bantiella columbina
- Bantiella fusca
- Bantiella hyalina
- Bantiella pallida
- Bantiella trinitatis

== Genus Belomantis ==
- Belomantis helenae
- Belomantis mirei
- Belomantis occidentalis

== Genus Betamantis ==
- Betamantis aliena
- Betamantis marginella

== Genus Bimantis ==
- Bimantis malaccana

== Genus Bistanta ==
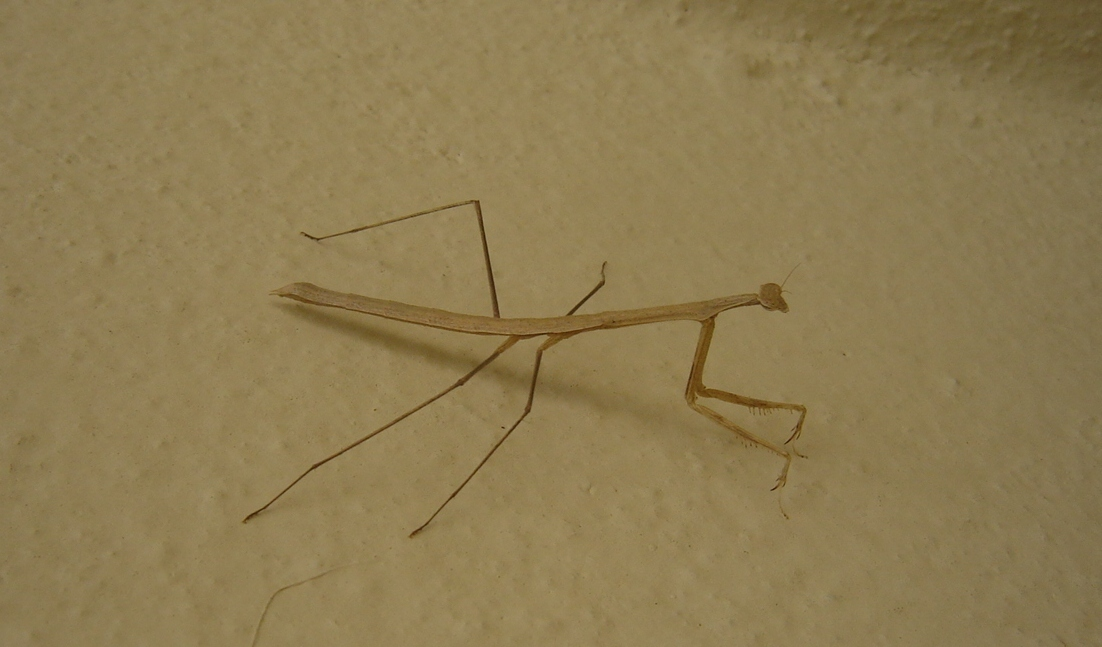
Bistanta mexicana

- Bistanta mexicana
- Bistanta addenda
- Bistanta campestris
- Bistanta herema
- Bistanta tolteca

== Genus Bisanthe ==
- Bisanthe lagrecai
- Bisanthe menyharthi
- Bisanthe modesta
- Bisanthe pulchripennis
- Bisanthe tricolor

== Genus Blepharodes ==
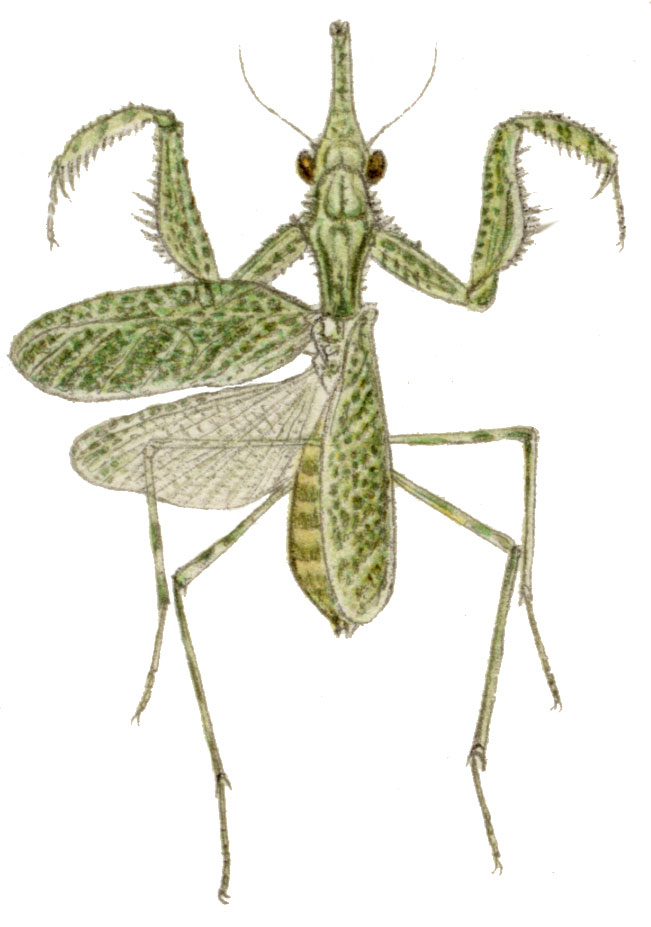
Blepharodes cornutus

- Blepharodes candelarius
- Blepharodes cornutus
- Blepharodes parumspinosus
- Blepharodes sudanensis

== Genus Blepharopsis ==
- Blepharopsis mendica (Egyptian flower mantis, thistle mantis)

== Genus Bolbe ==
- Bolbe lowi
- Bolbe maia
- Bolbe nigra
- Bolbe pallida
- Bolbe pygmaea

== Genus Bolbella ==
- Bolbella affinis
- Bolbella brevis
- Bolbella kaltenbachi
- Bolbella punctigera
- Bolbella rhodesiaca
- Bolbella uhligi

== Genus Bolbena ==
- Bolbena assimilis
- Bolbena hottentotta
- Bolbena maraisi
- Bolbena minor
- Bolbena orientalis
- Bolbena minutissima

== Genus Bolbula ==
- Bolbula debilis
- Bolbula exigua
- Bolbula widenmanni

== Genus Bolivaria ==
- Bolivaria amnicola
- Bolivaria brachyptera
- Bolivaria kurda

== Genus Bolivaroscelis ==
- Bolivaroscelis bolivarii
- Bolivaroscelis carinata
- Bolivaroscelis werneri

== Genus Brunneria ==
Brunneria, species of which are known as stick mantises, are found in North America, Central America, and South America.

- Brunneria borealis (Northern Grass Mantis, Brunner's mantis, Brunner's stick mantis, American stick mantis)
- Brunneria brasiliensis (Brazilian stick mantis)
- Brunneria gracilis
- Brunneria grandis
- Brunneria longa
- Brunneria subaptera (small-winged stick mantis)

== Genus Brancsikia ==
- Brancsikia aeroplana (Lamberton, 1911)
- Brancsikia freyi (Brancsik, 1893)

== Genus †Burmantis ==
- †Burmantis asiatica
- †Burmantis lebanensis
- †Burmantis zherikhini

== Genus Calamothespis ==
- Calamothespis adusta
- Calamothespis aspoeckorum
- Calamothespis condamini
- Calamothespis congica
- Calamothespis guineensis
- Calamothespis kibweziana
- Calamothespis lesnei
- Calamothespis lineatipennis
- Calamothespis nathani
- Calamothespis oxyops
- Calamothespis prosti
- Calamothespis rourei
- Calamothespis subcornuta
- Calamothespis tanzaniensis
- Calamothespis taylori
- Calamothespis vansoni
- Calamothespis vuattouxi

== Genus Caliris ==
- Caliris elegans
- Caliris masoni
- Caliris melli
- Caliris pallens
- Caliris pallida

== Genus Callibia ==
- Callibia diana

== Genus Callimantis ==
- Callimantis antillarum

== Genus Callivates ==
- Callivates stephanei

== Genus Calofulcinia ==
- Calofulcinia australis
- Calofulcinia elegans
- Calofulcinia integra
- Calofulcinia oxynota
- Calofulcinia paraoxypila
- Calofulcinia vidua
- Calofulcinia viridula

== Genus Camelomantis ==
- Camelomantis giraffa
- Camelomantis gracillima
- Camelomantis moultoni
- Camelomantis parva
- Camelomantis penangica
- Camelomantis sondaica
- Camelomantis sumatrana

== Genus Cardioptera ==
- Cardioptera brachyptera
- Cardioptera minor
- Cardioptera nigridens
- Cardioptera parva
- Cardioptera squalodon

== Genus Carrikerella ==
- Carrikerella ceratophora
- Carrikerella empusa
- Carrikerella simpira

== Genus Carvilia ==
- Carvilia gracilis
- Carvilia obscura
- Carvilia saussurii

== Genus Cataspilota ==
- Cataspilota armicollis
- Cataspilota calabarica
- Cataspilota guineensis
- Cataspilota lolodorfana
- Cataspilota misana
- Cataspilota pulchra
- Cataspilota tristis

== Genus Catestiasula ==
- Catestiasula moultoni
- Catestiasula nitida
- Catestiasula seminigra

== Genus Catoxyopsis ==
- Catoxyopsis dubiosa

== Genus Caudatoscelis ==
- Caudatoscelis annulipes
- Caudatoscelis caudata
- Caudatoscelis collarti
- Caudatoscelis lagrecai
- Caudatoscelis marmorata

== Genus Ceratocrania ==
- Ceratocrania macra
- Ceratocrania malayae

== Genus Ceratomantis ==
- Ceratomantis ghatei
- Ceratomantis gigliotosi
- Ceratomantis kimberlae
- Ceratomantis saussurii
- Ceratomantis yunnanensis

== Genus Chaeteessa ==
- †Chaeteessa brevialata
- Chaeteessa burmeisteri
- Chaeteessa caudata
- Chaeteessa filata
- Chaeteessa nana
- Chaeteessa nigromarginata
- Chaeteessa valida

== Genus †Chaeteessites ==
- †Chaeteessites minutissimus

== Genus Charieis ==
- Charieis peeli

== Genus Chlidonoptera ==
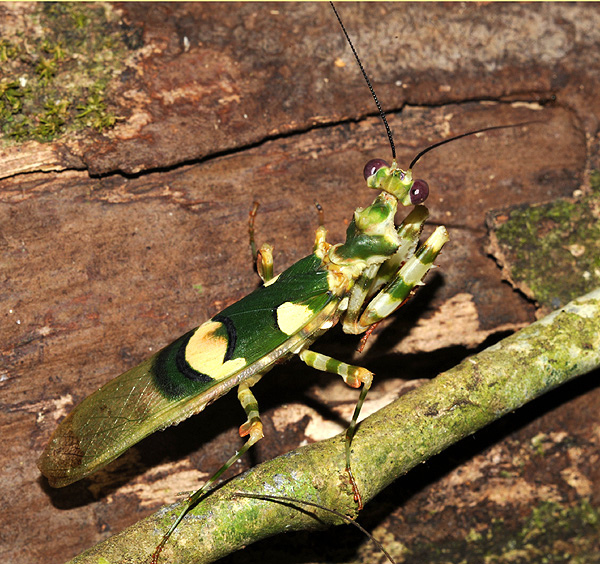
Chlidonoptera vexillum

The species in this genus are known as African Flower Mantises

- Chlidonoptera chopardi
- Chlidonoptera lestoni
- Chlidonoptera roxanae
- Chlidonoptera vexillum
- Chlidonoptera werneri

== Genus Chlorocalis ==
- Chlorocalis maternaschulzei
- Chlorocalis prasina

== Genus Chloroharpax ==
- Chloroharpax modesta (Nigerian flower mantis)

== Genus Chloromantis ==
- Chloromantis impunctata
- Chloromantis rhombica

== Genus Chloromiopteryx ==
- Chloromiopteryx mirim
- Chloromiopteryx modesta
- Chloromiopteryx plurilobata
- Chloromiopteryx thalassina

== Genus Choeradodis ==
Members of this genus are commonly known as shield mantises, hooded mantises, or leaf mantises.

- Choeradodis columbica (Columbian shield mantis)
- Choeradodis rhombicollis (Peruvian shield mantis)
- Choeradodis rhomboidea (Tropical shield mantis, Hooded mantis, Cobra Mantis, leaf mantis)
- Choeradodis stalii (tropical shield mantis, Hooded mantis, leaf mantis)
- Choeradodis strumaria (leaf mantis)

== Genus Chopardempusa ==
- Chopardempusa neglecta

== Genus Chopardentella ==
- Chopardentella royi

== Genus Chopardiella ==
- Chopardiella heterogamia
- Chopardiella latipennis
- Chopardiella poulaini

== Genus Chroicoptera ==
- Chroicoptera longa
- Chroicoptera saussurei
- Chroicoptera vidua

== Genus Chromatophotina ==
- Chromatophotina awajun
- Chromatophotina cofan

== Genus Chrysomantis ==
- Chrysomantis cachani
- Chrysomantis congica
- Chrysomantis girardi
- Chrysomantis royi
- Chrysomantis speciosa
- Chrysomantis tessmanni

== Genus Cilnia ==
- Cilnia chopardi
- Cilnia humeralis (Wide-armed mantis)

== Genus Citharomantis ==
- Citharomantis falcata (Malaysian Skirt Mantis, Skirt Mantis)

== Genus Ciulfina ==
- Ciulfina annecharlotteae
- Ciulfina baldersoni
- Ciulfina biseriata
- Ciulfina herbersteinae
- Ciulfina ianrichardi
- Ciulfina klassi
- Ciulfina liturgusa
- Ciulfina rentzi
- Ciulfina terrymariceae

== Genus Cliomantis ==
Cliomantis cornuta

- Cliomantis cornuta
- Cliomantis dispar
- Cliomantis lateralis
- Cliomantis obscura

== Genus Coenomantis ==
- Coenomantis kraussiana

== Genus Compsomantis ==
- Compsomantis ceylonica
- Compsomantis crassiceps
- Compsomantis mindoroensis
- Compsomantis robusta
- Compsomantis semirufula
- Compsomantis tumidiceps

== Genus Compsothespis ==
- Compsothespis abyssinica
- Compsothespis anomala
- Compsothespis australiensis
- Compsothespis brevipennis
- Compsothespis cinnabarina
- Compsothespis ebneri
- Compsothespis falcifera
- Compsothespis hispida
- Compsothespis kilwana
- Compsothespis marginipennis
- Compsothespis michaelseni
- Compsothespis natalica
- Compsothespis occidentalis
- Compsothespis zavattarii

== Genus Congoharpax ==
- Congoharpax aberrans
- Congoharpax boulardi
- Congoharpax coiffaiti
- Congoharpax judithae

== Genus Congomantis ==
- Congomantis femoralis

== Genus Coptopteryx ==
- Coptopteryx argentina
- Coptopteryx claraziana
- Coptopteryx constricta
- Coptopteryx gayi
- Coptopteryx gracilis
- Coptopteryx grisea
- Coptopteryx inermis
- Coptopteryx magna
- Coptopteryx mesomelas
- Coptopteryx minuta
- Coptopteryx parva
- Coptopteryx platana
- Coptopteryx pusilla
- Coptopteryx rebrevipennis
- Coptopteryx spinosa
- Coptopteryx thoracica
- Coptopteryx thoracoides
- Coptopteryx viridis

== Genus Cornucollis ==
- Cornucollis masoalensis

== Genus Corthylomantis ==
- Corthylomantis baldersoni

== Genus Corticomantis ==
- Corticomantis atricoxata

== Genus Cotigaonopsis ==
- Cotigaonopsis providenceae

== Genus Creobroter ==
With their wings adorned with patterns even when at rest, Creobroter, a genus concentrated in Western Asia, is one of the best-known genera to which the common name "flower mantis" is applied.

- Creobroter apicalis (Apicalis Flower Mantis)
- Creobroter celebensis
- Creobroter discifera
- Creobroter episcopalis
- Creobroter fasciatus
- Creobroter fuscoareatus
- Creobroter gemmatus (Jeweled flower mantis, Asian Flower Mantis) Indian flower mantis)
- Creobroter granulicollis
- Creobroter insolitus
- Creobroter jiangxiensis
- Creobroter labuanae
- Creobroter laevicollis
- Creobroter medanus
- Creobroter meleagris
- Creobroter nebulosa (Chinese Flower Mantis)
- Creobroter pictipennis (Indian flower mantis)
- Creobroter signifer
- Creobroter sumatranus
- Creobroter urbanus
- Creobroter vitripennis

== Genus †Cretophotina ==
- †Cretophotina mongolica
- †Cretophotina santanensis
- †Cretophotina serotina
- †Cretophotina tristriata

== Genus Dactylopteryx ==
- Dactylopteryx flexuosa
- Dactylopteryx intermedia
- Dactylopteryx orientalis

== Genus Danuria ==
Also known as Danuria Stick Mantises, or giant grass mantises, these are characterised by long slender bodies and sloping, pointed eyes.

- Danuria affinis
- Danuria angusticollis
- Danuria barbozae
- Danuria buchholzi
- Danuria congica
- Danuria contorta
- Danuria fusca
- Danuria gracilis
- Danuria impannosa
- Danuria kilimandjarica
- Danuria obscuripennis
- Danuria serratodentata
- Danuria sublineata
- Danuria thunbergi

== Genus Danuriella ==
- Danuriella altera
- Danuriella andriai
- Danuriella anjouanensis
- Danuriella griveaudi
- Danuriella irregularis
- Danuriella madagascariensis
- Danuriella marojejyensis
- Danuriella mayottensis
- Danuriella merigueti
- Danuriella sogai
- Danuriella tigrina
- Danuriella viettei

== Genus Decimiana ==
- Decimiana bolivari
- Decimiana clavata
- Decimiana elliptica
- Decimiana gaucha
- Decimiana hebardi
- Decimiana rehni
- Decimiana tessellata

== Genus Deiphobe ==
- Deiphobe australiana
- Deiphobe brevipennis
- Deiphobe brunneri
- Deiphobe infuscata
- Deiphobe longipes
- Deiphobe mesomelas
- Deiphobe moseri
- Deiphobe xanthoptera

== Genus Deiphobella ==
- Deiphobella gardneri
- Deiphobella laticeps

== Genus Deromantis ==
- Deromantis limbalicollis

== Genus Deroplatys ==
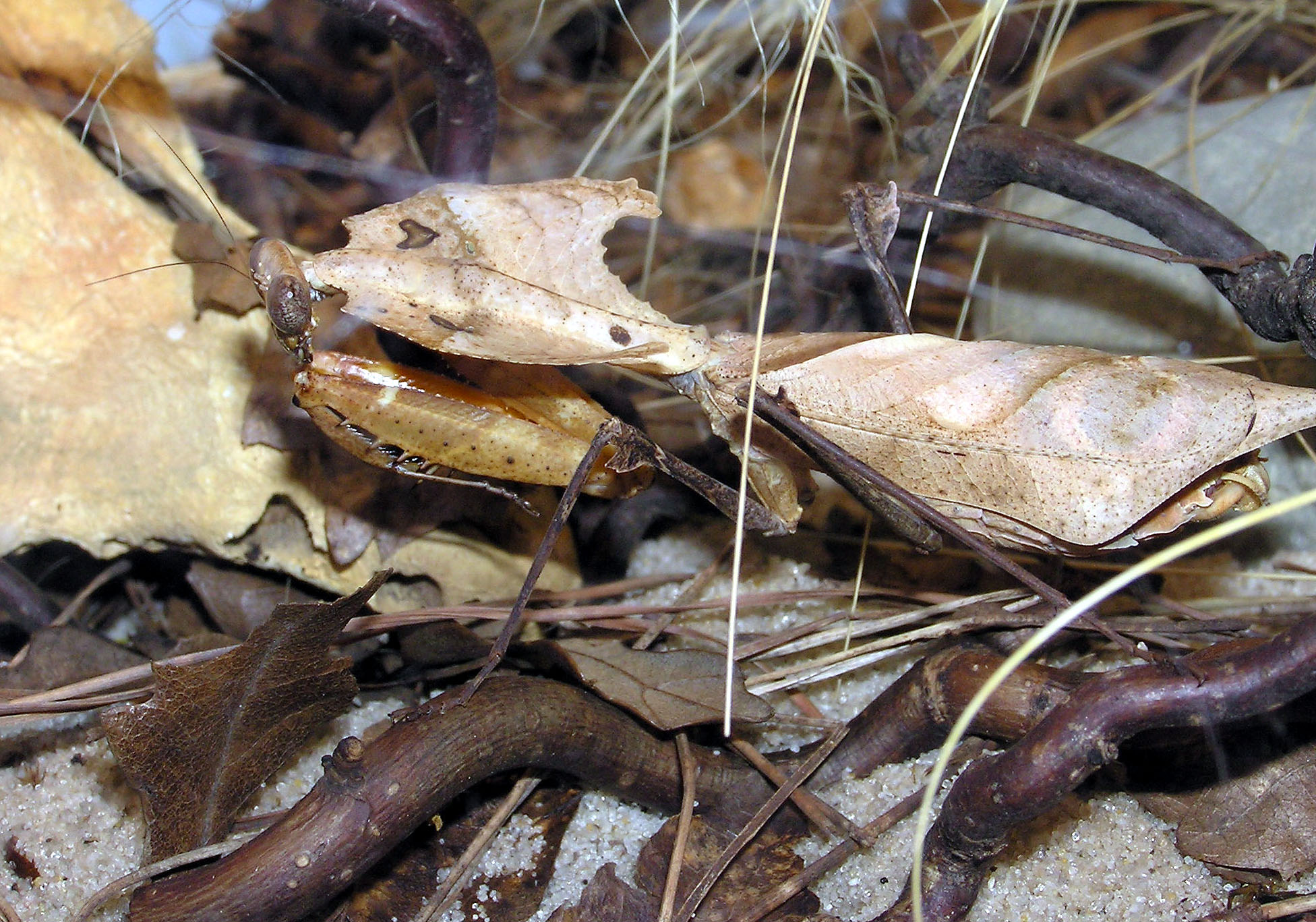
Deroplatys desiccata

Deroplatys, the best-known of the so-called dead leaf mantises, are native to Asia.

- Deroplatys angustata (Westwood, 1845)
- Deroplatys cordata (Fabricius, 1798)
- Deroplatys desiccata (Westwood, 1839) (Giant Dead leaf mantis, Malaysian dead leaf mantis, dead leaf mantis)
- Deroplatys gorochovi (Anisyutkin, 1998)
- Deroplatys indica (Roy, 2007)
- Deroplatys lobata (Guérin-Méneville (1838) (Southeast Asian Dead Leaf Mantis, Malaysian dead leaf mantis, dead leaf mantis)
- Deroplatys moultoni (Giglio-Tos, 1917)
- Deroplatys philippinica (Werner, 1922) (Philippines dead leaf mantis)
- Deroplatys rhombica (Brunner, 1897)
- Deroplatys sarawaca (Westwood, 1889)
- Deroplatys trigonodera (Westwood, 1889) (dead leaf mantis)
- Deroplatys truncata (Guerin-Meneville, 1843) (dead leaf mantis)

== Genus Diabantia ==
- Diabantia minima

== Genus Didymocorypha ==
- Didymocorypha lanceolata
- Didymocorypha libaii

== Genus Dilatempusa ==
- Dilatempusa aegyptiaca

== Genus Dimantis ==
- Dimantis haani

== Genus Dracomantis ==
- Dracomantis mirofraternus

== Genus Dysaules ==
- Dysaules brevipennis
- Dysaules himalayanus
- Dysaules longicollis
- Dysaules uvana

== Genus Dysaulophthalma ==
- Dysaulophthalma nathani

== Genus Dystacta ==
- Dystacta alticeps
- Dystacta tigrifrutex

== Genus Dystactula ==
- Dystactula grisea
- Dystactula kaltenbachi
- Dystactula natalensis

== Genus Elaea ==
- Elaea gestroi
- Elaea infumata
- Elaea marchali
- Elaea perloides
- Elaea richteri
- Elaea solimani
- Elaea somalica

== Genus Elmantis ==
- Elmantis lata
- Elmantis nira
- Elmantis trincomaliae

== Genus Empusa ==
Empusa fasciata

- Empusa binotata
- Empusa fasciata
- Empusa guttula
- Empusa hedenborgii
- Empusa longicollis
- Empusa pennata (conehead mantis, also Spanish mantis palo meaning "stick mantis")
- Empusa pennicornis
- Empusa romboidea
- Empusa simonyi
- Empusa spinosa
- Empusa uvarovi

== Genus Enicophlebia ==
- Enicophlebia hilara
- Enicophlebia pallida

== Genus Entella ==
- Entella angolensis
- Entella angolica
- Entella brunni
- Entella congica
- Entella delalandi
- Entella exilis
- Entella femina
- Entella fuliginosa
- Entella gaerdesi
- Entella grandis
- Entella machadoi
- Entella meruensis
- Entella minor
- Entella natalica
- Entella nebulosa
- Entella obscura
- Entella orientalis
- Entella personata
- Entella pusilla
- Entella reussi
- Entella rudebecki
- Entella rukwaensis
- Entella stegmanni
- Entella taborana
- Entella transvaalica
- Entella vitticeps

== Genus Entelloptera ==
- Entelloptera rogenhoferi

== Genus Eomantis ==
- Eomantis guttatipennis
- Eomantis iridipennis
- Eomantis yunnanensis (Yellow Spotted Wing Mantis)

== Genus Epaphrodita ==
- Epaphrodita lobivertex
- Epaphrodita musarum
- Epaphrodita undulata

== Genus Ephestiasula ==
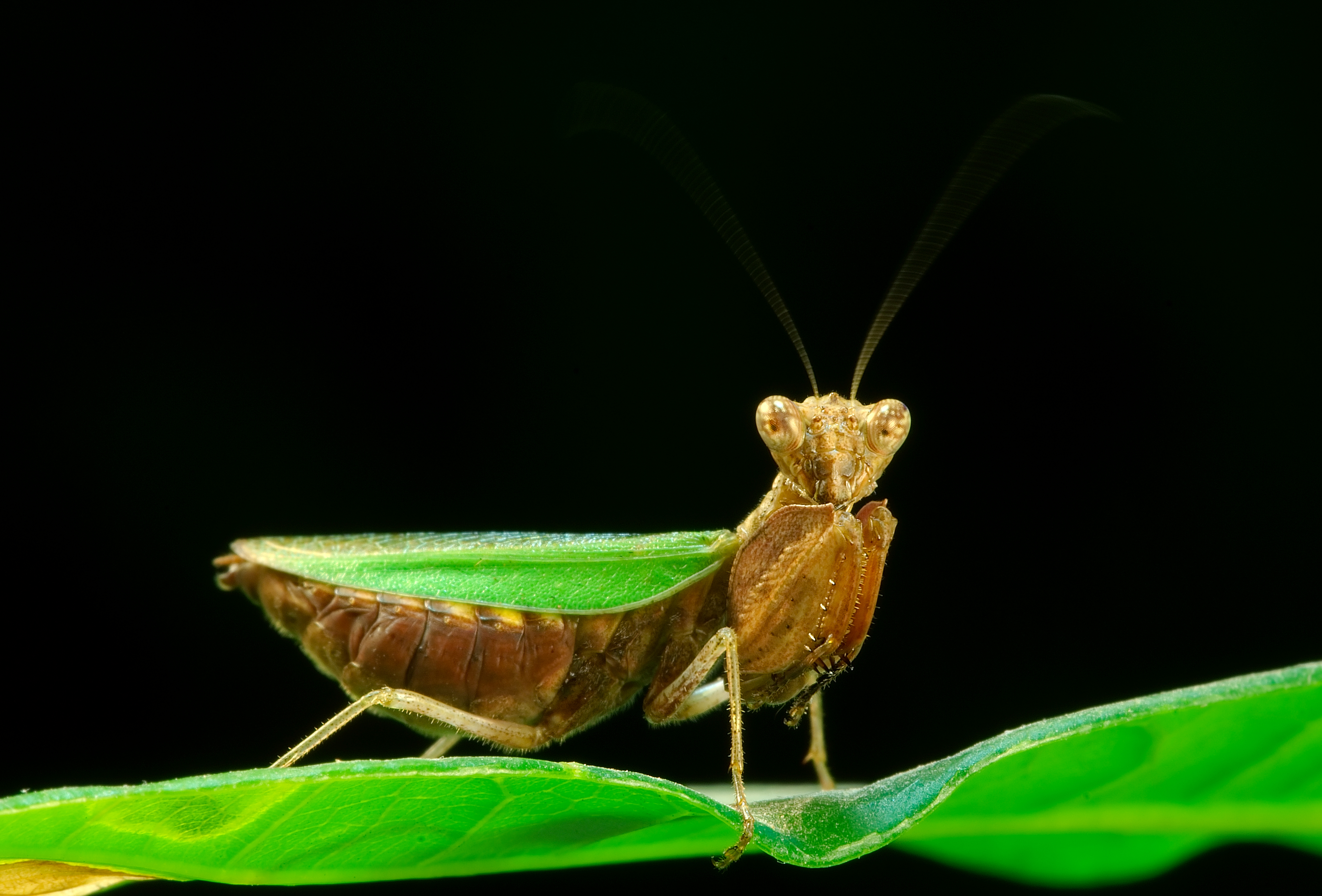
Ephestiasula sp.

- Ephestiasula obscura
- Ephestiasula rogenhoferi
- Ephestiasula woodmasoni

== Genus Ephierodula ==
- Ephierodula albomaculata
- Ephierodula excellens
- Ephierodula heteroptera
- Ephierodula meihuashana

== Genus Episcopomantis ==
Episcopomantis chalybea

- Episcopomantis chalybea
- Episcopomantis congica

== Genus Epitenodera ==
- Epitenodera brevipennis
- Epitenodera capitata
- Epitenodera equatoriana
- Epitenodera gambiensis
- Epitenodera herbacea
- Epitenodera houyi
- Epitenodera nimbana

== Genus Epsomantis ==
- Epsomantis tortricoides

== Genus Eremiaphila ==
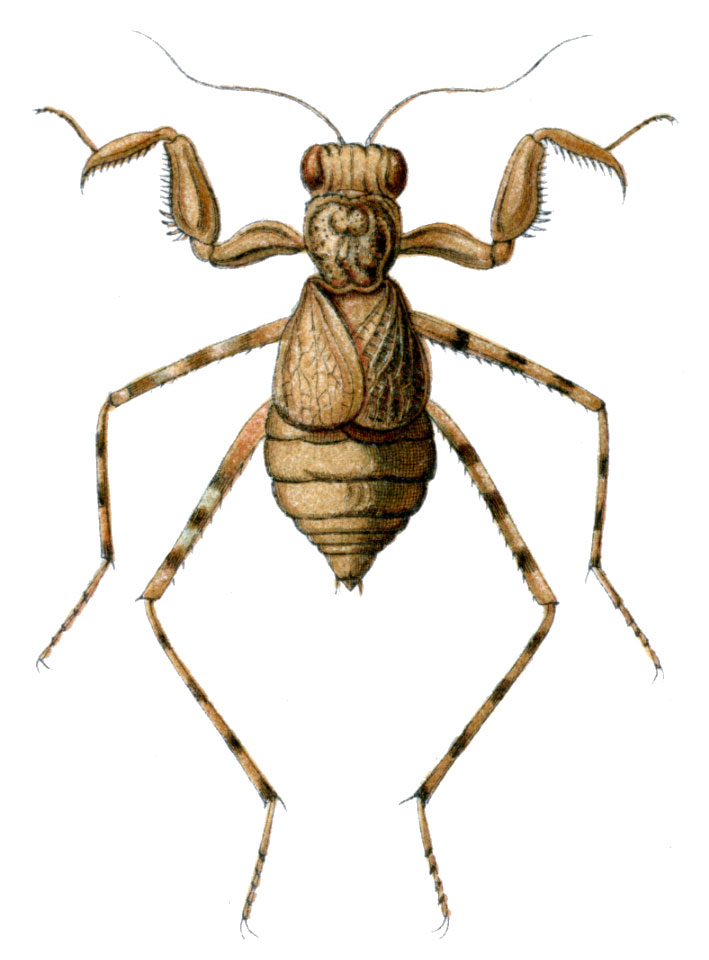
Eremiaphila cerisyi

- Eremiaphila ammonita
- Eremiaphila andresi
- Eremiaphila anubis
- Eremiaphila arabica
- Eremiaphila aristidis
- Eremiaphila audouini
- Eremiaphila barbara
- Eremiaphila berndstiewi
- Eremiaphila bifasciata
- Eremiaphila bovei
- Eremiaphila braueri
- Eremiaphila brevipennis
- Eremiaphila brunneri (common desert mantis)
- Eremiaphila cairina
- Eremiaphila cerisyi
- Eremiaphila collenettei
- Eremiaphila cordofana
- Eremiaphila cycloptera
- Eremiaphila dagi
- Eremiaphila dentata
- Eremiaphila denticollis
- Eremiaphila foureaui
- Eremiaphila fraseri
- Eremiaphila genei
- Eremiaphila gigas
- Eremiaphila hebraica
- Eremiaphila heluanensis
- Eremiaphila irridipennis
- Eremiaphila khamsini
- Eremiaphila kheychi
- Eremiaphila klunzingeri
- Eremiaphila laeviceps
- Eremiaphila lefebvrii
- Eremiaphila luxor
- Eremiaphila maculipennis
- Eremiaphila monodi
- Eremiaphila moretii
- Eremiaphila murati
- Eremiaphila mzabi
- Eremiaphila nilotica
- Eremiaphila nova
- Eremiaphila numida
- Eremiaphila persica
- Eremiaphila petiti
- Eremiaphila pierrei
- Eremiaphila pyramidum
- Eremiaphila rectangulata
- Eremiaphila reticulata
- Eremiaphila rohlfsi
- Eremiaphila rotundipennis
- Eremiaphila rufipennis
- Eremiaphila rufula
- Eremiaphila savignyi
- Eremiaphila somalica
- Eremiaphila spinulosa
- Eremiaphila tuberculifera
- Eremiaphila turica
- Eremiaphila typhon
- Eremiaphila uvarovi
- Eremiaphila voltaensis
- Eremiaphila werneri
- Eremiaphila wettsteini
- Eremiaphila yemenita
- Eremiaphila zetterstedti (desert pebble mantis)

== Genus Eremoplana ==
- Eremoplana guerini
- Eremoplana infelix

== Genus Euchomena ==
- Euchomena madecassa

== Genus Euchomenella ==
Members of this genus are known as Giraffe Mantises, long neck mantises or twig mantises.

Euchomenella moluccarum

- Euchomenella adwinae
- Euchomenella apicalis
- Euchomenella heteroptera (Giraffe Mantis, twig mantis, Malaysia long neck mantis)
- Euchomenella macrops (long neck mantis)
- Euchomenella matilei
- Euchomenella moluccarum
- Euchomenella thoracica
- Euchomenella udovichenkoi

== Genus Eumiopteryx ==
- Eumiopteryx bicentenaria
- Eumiopteryx laticollis
- Eumiopteryx terrai

== Genus Eumusonia ==
- Eumusonia intermedia
- Eumusonia livida
- Eumusonia viridis

== Genus Euthyphleps ==
- Euthyphleps curtipes
- Euthyphleps rectivenis
- Euthyphleps tectiformis

== Genus Exparoxypilus ==
- Exparoxypilus africanus

== Genus Fuga ==
- Fuga annulipes
- Fuga fluminensis
- Fuga grimaldii

== Genus Fulcinia ==
- Fulcinia alaris
- Fulcinia exilis
- Fulcinia lobata
- Fulcinia punctipes
- Fulcinia uxor
- Fulcinia variipennis

== Genus Fulciniella ==
- Fulciniella infumata
- Fulciniella loriae
- Fulciniella verticalis

== Genus Fulciniola ==
- Fulciniola snelleni

== Genus Galapagia ==
- Galapagia amazonica
- Galapagia solitaria

== Genus Galepsus ==
- Galepsus aberrans
- Galepsus affinis
- Galepsus angolensis
- Galepsus beieri
- Galepsus binotatus
- Galepsus bioculatus
- Galepsus bipunctatus
- Galepsus birkenmeierae
- Galepsus bispinosus
- Galepsus brincki
- Galepsus brunneri
- Galepsus bucheti
- Galepsus buettneri
- Galepsus cacuminatus
- Galepsus capensis
- Galepsus capitatus
- Galepsus centralis
- Galepsus cliquennoisi
- Galepsus congicus
- Galepsus coronatus
- Galepsus culminans
- Galepsus damaranus
- Galepsus decipiens
- Galepsus denigratus
- Galepsus diversus
- Galepsus dubius
- Galepsus dudleyi
- Galepsus erythraeus
- Galepsus fallaciosus
- Galepsus fallax
- Galepsus feae
- Galepsus femoratus
- Galepsus focki
- Galepsus fumipennis
- Galepsus globiceps
- Galepsus gracilis
- Galepsus inermis
- Galepsus intermedius
- Galepsus konakrynus
- Galepsus laticeps
- Galepsus lenticularis
- Galepsus letabaensis
- Galepsus machadoi
- Galepsus malawiensis
- Galepsus meridionalis
- Galepsus minima
- Galepsus minutus
- Galepsus montanus
- Galepsus nigricoxa
- Galepsus nimulensis
- Galepsus nyassensis
- Galepsus oxycephalus
- Galepsus pentheri
- Galepsus rhodesicus
- Galepsus rouxi
- Galepsus schwetzi
- Galepsus scorteccii
- Galepsus signatus
- Galepsus sudanensis
- Galepsus supervacaneus
- Galepsus tenuis
- Galepsus thomseni
- Galepsus transvaalensis
- Galepsus ulricae
- Galepsus wittei

== Genus Galinthias ==
Galinthias amoena

- Galinthias amoena (Kenyan Flower Mantis, Cone-eye Mantid)
- Galinthias meruensis
- Galinthias occidentalis
- Galinthias philbyi
- Galinthias rhomboidalis

== Genus Geomantis ==
- Geomantis algerica
- Geomantis larvoides

== Genus Geothespis ==
- Geothespis australis

== Genus Gigliotoscelis ==
- Gigliotoscelis simulans

== Genus Gildella ==
- Gildella suavis

== Genus Gimantis ==
- Gimantis assamica
- Gimantis authaemon
- Gimantis insularis
- Gimantis marmorata

== Genus Gonatista ==
- Gonatista grisea (grizzled mantis, lichen mimic)
- Gonatista jaiba
- Gonatista major
- Gonatista phryganoides
- Gonatista reticulata

== Genus Gonatistella ==
- Gonatistella nigropicta

== Genus Gongylus ==
Gongylus gongylodes

- Gongylus gongylodes (Wandering Violin Mantis, Indian Rose Mantis)
- Gongylus pauperatus
- Gongylus trachelophyllus

== Genus Gonypeta ==
- Gonypeta borneana
- Gonypeta brigittae
- Gonypeta brunneri
- Gonypeta humbertiana
- Gonypeta noctivaga
- Gonypeta punctata
- Gonypeta rotundata
- Gonypeta simplex

== Genus Gonypetella ==
- Gonypetella atra
- Gonypetella atrocephala
- Gonypetella australis
- Gonypetella carinata
- Gonypetella deletrix
- Gonypetella flavicornis
- Gonypetella fusca
- Gonypetella fuscipes
- Gonypetella infumata
- Gonypetella ivoirensis
- Gonypetella kilimandjarica
- Gonypetella punctata

== Genus Gonypetoides ==
- Gonypetoides brevipennis

== Genus Gonypetyllis ==
- Gonypetyllis liliputana
- Gonypetyllis micra
- Gonypetyllis semuncialis

== Genus Gretella ==
- Gretella gracilis

== Genus Gyromantis ==
The two members of this genus are commonly known as bark mantises.

- Gyromantis kraussii (spiny bark mantis)
- Gyromantis occidentalis (eastern bark mantis)

== Genus Haania ==
Some species in this genus are sometimes called, Moss mantis.

- Haania aspera
- Haania borneana
- Haania confusa
- Haania dispar
- Haania doroshenkoi
- Haania lobiceps
- Haania orlovi
- Haania philippina
- Haania simplex
- Haania vitalisi

== Genus Hagiomantis ==
- Hagiomantis mesopoda
- Hagiomantis ornata
- Hagiomantis pallida
- Hagiomantis superba
- Hagiomantis surinamensis

== Genus Hapalogymnes ==
- Hapalogymnes gymnes

== Genus Hapalomantis ==
- Hapalomantis abyssinica
- Hapalomantis congica
- Hapalomantis katangica
- Hapalomantis lacualis
- Hapalomantis minima
- Hapalomantis orba
- Hapalomantis rhombochir

== Genus Hapalopeza ==
- Hapalopeza fulmeki
- Hapalopeza nigricornis
- Hapalopeza nilgirica
- Hapalopeza nitens
- Hapalopeza periyara
- Hapalopeza tigrina

== Genus Hapalopezella ==
- Hapalopezella maculata

== Genus Harpagomantis ==
- Harpagomantis tricolor (African False Flower Mantis)

== Genus Hebardia ==
- Hebardia pellucida

== Genus Hebardiella ==
- Hebardiella karnyi
- Hebardiella rehni

== Genus Hedigerella ==
- Hedigerella fasciatella

== Genus Heliomantis ==
- Heliomantis elegans

== Genus Helvia ==
- Helvia cardinalis (Yellow Orchid Mantis)

== Genus Hemiempusa ==
- Hemiempusa capensis

== Genus Hestiasula ==
- Hestiasula brachyptera
- Hestiasula brunneriana
- Hestiasula castetsi
- Hestiasula ceylonica
- Hestiasula gyldenstolpei
- Hestiasula kastneri
- Hestiasula masoni
- Hestiasula nigrofemorata
- Hestiasula woodi
- Hestiasula zhejiangensis

== Genus Heterochaeta ==
All species in this genus are known as Giant African Stick Mantises. Some of them, such as H. orientalis, are sometimes called Cat-eyed Mantis.

- Heterochaeta bernardii
- Heterochaeta girardi
- Heterochaeta kumari
- Heterochaeta lamellosa
- Heterochaeta occidentalis
- Heterochaeta orientalis (Cat-eyed Mantis, Giant African Stick Mantis)
- Heterochaeta pantherina
- Heterochaeta reticulata
- Heterochaeta strachani
- Heterochaeta tenuipes
- Heterochaeta zavattarii

== Genus Heterochaetula ==
- Heterochaetula fissispinis
- Heterochaetula straminea
- Heterochaetula tricolor

== Genus Heteronutarsus ==
- Heteronutarsus aegyptiacus
- Heteronutarsus albipennis
- Heteronutarsus arenivagus
- Heteronutarsus zolotarevskyi

== Genus Heterovates ==
- Heterovates pardalina

== Genus Hicetia ==
- Hicetia breviceps
- Hicetia goediana
- Hicetia goeldiana

== Genus Hierodula ==
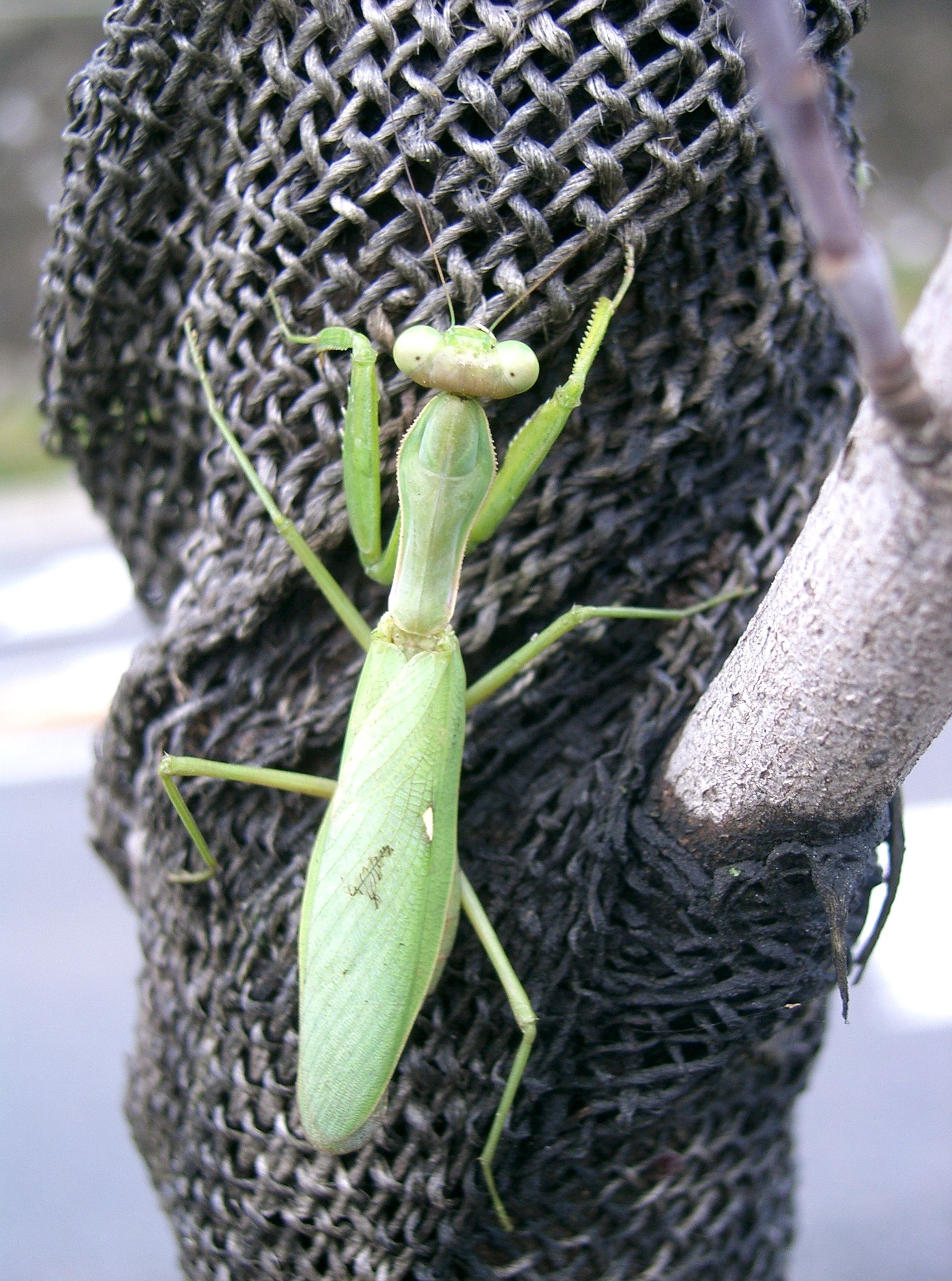
Hierodula patellifera

The giant Asian mantis genus Hierodula contains numerous large species and has a range that stretches from India to Hawaii.

- Hierodula ansusana
- Hierodula aruana
- Hierodula assamensis
- Hierodula atrocoxata
- Hierodula beieri
- Hierodula bhamoana
- Hierodula biaka
- Hierodula borneana
- Hierodula brunnea
- Hierodula chamoana
- Hierodula chinensis (Chinese Reddish Mantis)
- Hierodula coarctata
- Hierodula confusa
- Hierodula crassa
- Hierodula cuchingina'
- Hierodula dolichoptera
- Hierodula doveri
- Hierodula dyaka
- Hierodula everetti'
- Hierodula fumipennis
- Hierodula fuscescens
- Hierodula gigliotosi
- Hierodula gracilicollis
- Hierodula harpyia
- Hierodula heinrichi
- Hierodula inconspicua
- Hierodula ingens
- Hierodula italii
- Hierodula jobina
- Hierodula kapaurana
- Hierodula laevicollis
- Hierodula lamasonga
- Hierodula latipennis
- Hierodula longedentata
- Hierodula macrodentata
- Hierodula macrostigmata
- Hierodula maculata
- Hierodula maculisternum
- Hierodula major
- Hierodula majuscula (Giant Rainforest Mantis, Australian Giant Rainforest Mantis, Australian Giant Mantis)
- Hierodula malaccana
- Hierodula malaya
- Hierodula membranacea (Giant Asian mantis, Sri Lanka Mantis, Green mantis, Golden Giant Asian Mantis)
- Hierodula microdon
- Hierodula mindanensis
- Hierodula modesta
- Hierodula monochroa
- Hierodula multispinulosa
- Hierodula nicobarica
- Hierodula obiensis
- Hierodula obtusata
- Hierodula oraea
- Hierodula ovata
- Hierodula papua
- Hierodula parviceps (Marble Mantis)
- Hierodula patellifera (Giant Asian mantis, Asian Green Mantis)
- Hierodula perakana
- Hierodula philippina
- Hierodula pistillinota
- Hierodula prosternalis
- Hierodula pulchra
- Hierodula pulchripes
- Hierodula purpurescens
- Hierodula pustulifera
- Hierodula pygmaea
- Hierodula quadridens
- Hierodula quadripunctata
- Hierodula quinquecallosa
- Hierodula quinquepatellata
- Hierodula rajah
- Hierodula ralumina
- Hierodula robusta
- Hierodula rufomaculata
- Hierodula rufopatellata
- Hierodula salomonis (Jade mantis)
- Hierodula samangensis
- Hierodula sarsinorum
- Hierodula saussurei
- Hierodula schultzei
- Hierodula scutata
- Hierodula simbangana
- Hierodula similis
- Hierodula siporana
- Hierodula sorongana
- Hierodula sternosticta
- Hierodula stigmata
- Hierodula striata
- Hierodula striatipes
- Hierodula szentivanyi
- Hierodula tenuidentata
- Hierodula tenuis
- Hierodula timorensis (Timor Giant Mantis)
- Hierodula togiana
- Hierodula tonkinensis
- Hierodula tornica
- Hierodula transcaucasica (Transcaucasican Giant Mantis)
- Hierodula trimacula
- Hierodula unimaculata
- Hierodula venosa (Golden-armed Mantis, Golden Mantis, Golden Giant Asian Mantis, Venosa Mantis)
- Hierodula ventralis
- Hierodula versicolor
- Hierodula vitreoides
- Hierodula werneri
- Hierodula westwoodi

== Genus Hierodulella ==
- Hierodulella celebensis
- Hierodulella reticulata
- Hierodulella soror

== Genus Holaptilon ==
- Holaptilon brevipugilis
- Holaptilon pusillulum (jumping mantis)

== Genus Hondurantemna ==
- Hondurantemna chespiritoi

== Genus Hoplocoryphella ==
- Hoplocoryphella grandis

== Genus Hoplocorypha ==
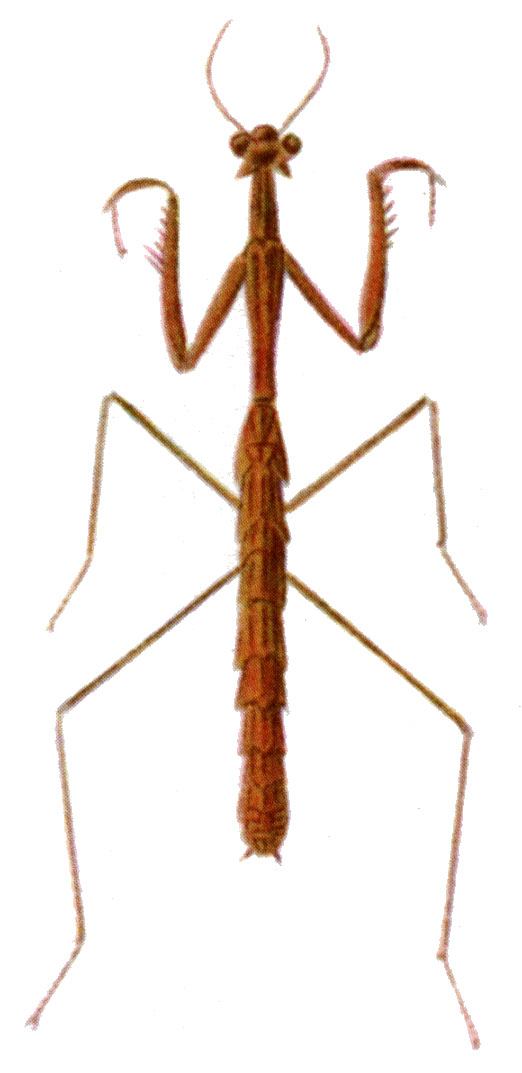
Hoplocorypha macra

Members of this genus are known collectively as African stick mantises.

- Hoplocorypha acuta
- Hoplocorypha bicornis
- Hoplocorypha boromensis
- Hoplocorypha bottegi
- Hoplocorypha boviformis
- Hoplocorypha brevicollis
- Hoplocorypha cacomana
- Hoplocorypha carli
- Hoplocorypha congica
- Hoplocorypha dentata
- Hoplocorypha distinguenda
- Hoplocorypha foliata
- Hoplocorypha fumosa
- Hoplocorypha galeata
- Hoplocorypha garuana
- Hoplocorypha hamulifera
- Hoplocorypha lacualis
- Hoplocorypha lobata
- Hoplocorypha macra
- Hoplocorypha mellea
- Hoplocorypha montana
- Hoplocorypha nana
- Hoplocorypha narocana
- Hoplocorypha nigerica
- Hoplocorypha nigra
- Hoplocorypha perplexa
- Hoplocorypha picea
- Hoplocorypha punctata
- Hoplocorypha rapax
- Hoplocorypha salfii
- Hoplocorypha saussurii
- Hoplocorypha sordida
- Hoplocorypha striata
- Hoplocorypha turneri
- Hoplocorypha ugandana
- Hoplocorypha vittata
- Hoplocorypha wittei

== Genus Hoplocoryphella ==
- Hoplocoryphella grandis (Hammerhead Mantis)

== Genus Humbertiella ==
- Humbertiella affinis
- Humbertiella africana
- Humbertiella assimilata
- Humbertiella brunneri
- Humbertiella ceylonica
- Humbertiella indica
- Humbertiella laosana
- Humbertiella nada
- Humbertiella nigrospinosa
- Humbertiella ocularis
- Humbertiella similis
- Humbertiella sindhica
- Humbertiella taprobanarum
- Humbertiella yunnanensis

== Genus Hyalomantis ==
- Hyalomantis antsingica
- Hyalomantis madagascariensis
- Hyalomantis murzini
- Hyalomantis whitingi

== Genus Hymenopus ==
Hymenopus species are commonly called orchid mantises.

- Hymenopus bicornis
- Hymenopus coronatoides
- Hymenopus coronatus (Malaysian orchid mantis, Orchid mantis)

== Genus Hypsicorypha ==
- Hypsicorypha gracilis

== Genus Idolomantis ==
- Idolomantis diabolica (giant devil's flower mantis, devil's flower mantis)

== Genus Idolomorpha ==
- Idolomorpha dentifrons (alien head mantis)
- Idolomorpha lateralis
- Idolomorpha madagascariensis
- Idolomorpha sagitta

== Genus Ilomantis ==
- Ilomantis ginsburgae
- Ilomantis thalassina

== Genus Ima ==
- Ima fusca

== Genus Indothespis ==
- Indothespis assamensis

== Genus Indomenella ==
- Indomenella indica

== Genus Iridopteryx ==
- Iridopteryx iridipennis

== Genus Iris ==
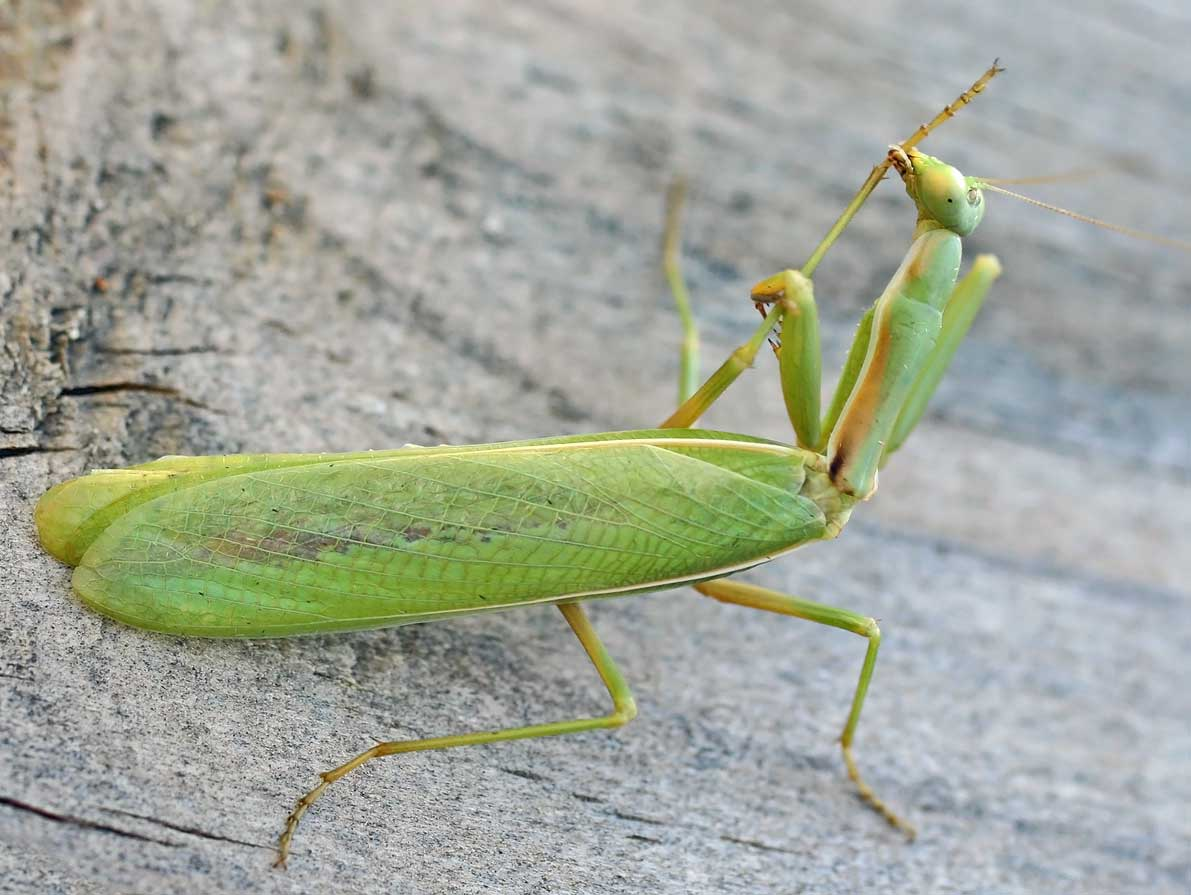
Iris oratoria

- Iris caeca
- Iris deserti
- Iris insolita
- Iris nana
- Iris narzykulovi
- Iris oratoria (Mediterranean mantis, Iris Mantis)
- Iris orientalis
- Iris persa
- Iris persiminima
- Iris pitcheri
- Iris polystictica (Dot-winged Mantis)
- Iris senegalensis
- Iris splendida
- Iris strigosa

== Genus Ischnomantis ==
- Ischnomantis aethiopica
- Ischnomantis fasciata
- Ischnomantis fatiloqua
- Ischnomantis flavescens
- Ischnomantis gigas
- Ischnomantis gracilis
- Ischnomantis grandis
- Ischnomantis media
- Ischnomantis perfida
- Ischnomantis spinigera
- Ischnomantis usambarica
- Ischnomantis werneri

== Genus †Jersimantis ==
- †Jersimantis burmiticus
- †Jersimantis luzzii

== Genus Junodia ==
- Junodia amoena
- Junodia beieri
- Junodia congica
- Junodia hararensis
- Junodia lameyi
- Junodia maternaschulzei
- Junodia spinosa
- Junodia stiewei
- Junodia strigipennis
- Junodia vansomereni
- Junodia vansoni

== Genus †Kazakhophotina ==
- †Kazakhophotina corrupta

== Genus Kongobatha ==
- Kongobatha diademata
- Kongobatha papua

== Genus Lagrecacanthops ==
- Lagrecacanthops brasiliensis
- Lagrecacanthops guyanensis

== Genus Leptocola ==
- Leptocola fragilis
- Leptocola giraffa
- Leptocola gracilis
- Leptocola gracillima
- Leptocola phthisica
- Leptocola seriepunctata
- Leptocola stanleyana

== Genus Leptomantella ==
- Leptomantella albella
- Leptomantella ceylonica
- Leptomantella fragilis
- Leptomantella indica
- Leptomantella lactea
- Leptomantella montana
- Leptomantella nigrocoxata
- Leptomantella parva
- Leptomantella tonkinae
- Leptomantella xizangensis

== Genus Leptomiopteryx ==
- Leptomiopteryx argentina
- Leptomiopteryx dispar

== Genus Leptosibylla ==
- Leptosibylla gracilis

== Genus Ligaria ==
- Ligaria aberrans
- Ligaria affinis
- Ligaria backlundi
- Ligaria brevicollis
- Ligaria brevis
- Ligaria chopardi
- Ligaria clara
- Ligaria costalis
- Ligaria culicivora
- Ligaria dentata
- Ligaria denticollis
- Ligaria diabolica
- Ligaria inexpectata
- Ligaria jeanneli
- Ligaria quadrinotata
- Ligaria quadripunctata
- Ligaria senegalensis

== Genus Ligariella ==
- Ligariella australis
- Ligariella bicornuta
- Ligariella bolivari
- Ligariella gracilis
- Ligariella trigonali

== Genus Ligentella ==
- Ligentella beieri
- Ligentella lacualis
- Ligentella zairensis

== Genus Liguanea ==
- Liguanea pediodromia

== Genus Litaneutria ==
- Litaneutria chaparrali
- Litaneutria emarginata
- Litaneutria minor (minor ground mantis)
- Litaneutria ocularis
- Litaneutria pacifica
- Litaneutria skinneri (Skinner's ground mantis)
- Litaneutria obscura
- Litaneutria littoralis
- Litaneutria baccina
- Litaneutria superna
- Litaneutria scopulosa

== Genus †Lithophotina ==
- †Lithophotina floccosa

== Genus Liturgusa ==
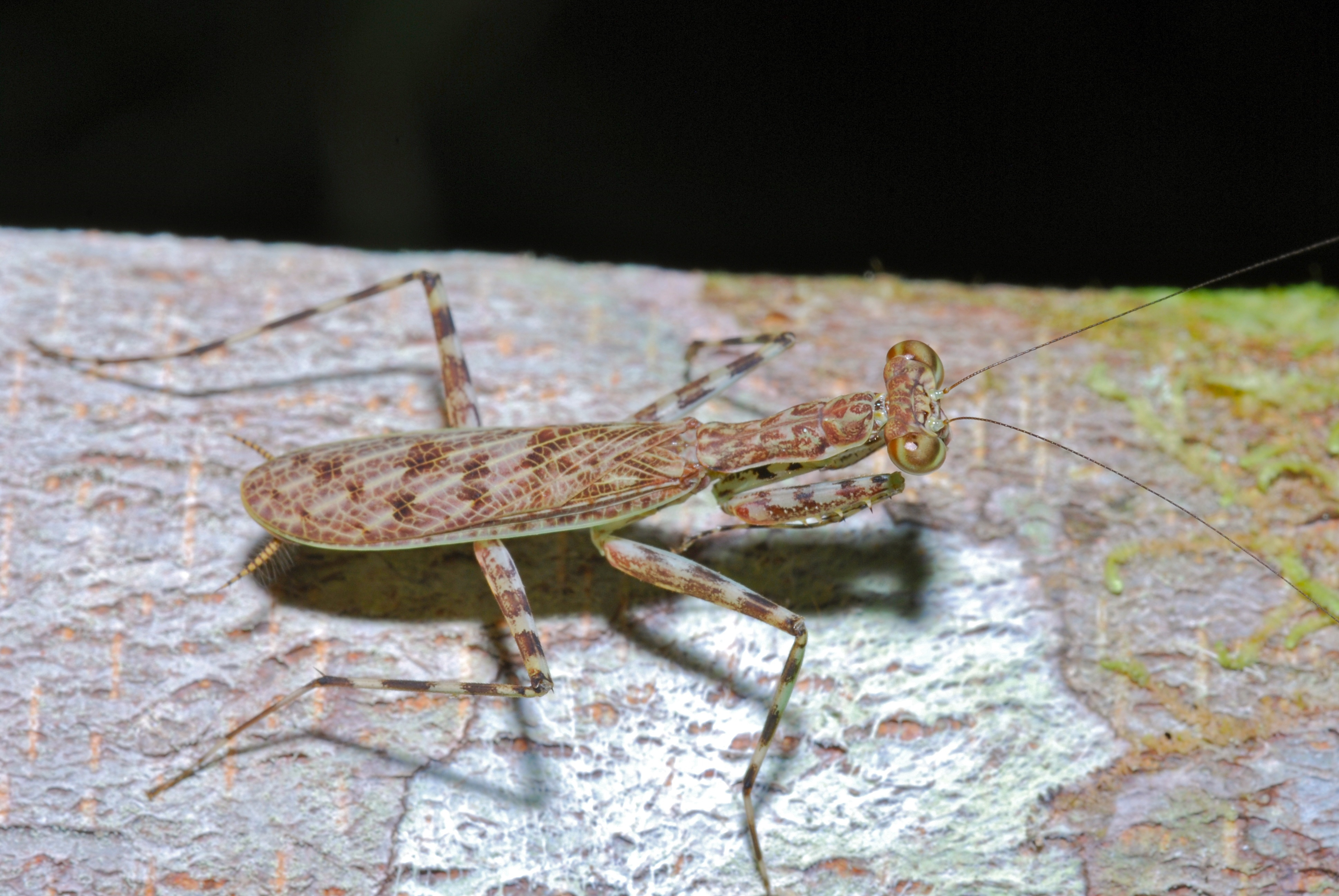
The Lichen Mantis (Liturgusa maya) as it is blending in to its surroundings.

- Liturgusa actuosa
- Liturgusa algorei
- Liturgusa bororum
- Liturgusa cameroni
- Liturgusa cayennensis
- Liturgusa charpentieri
- Liturgusa cura
- Liturgusa cursor
- Liturgusa dominica
- Liturgusa fossetti
- Liturgusa guyanensis
- Liturgusa kirtlandi
- Liturgusa krattorum (Kratt's Lichen Mantis)
- Liturgusa lichenalis
- Liturgusa manausensis
- Liturgusa maroni
- Liturgusa maya (Mayan Lichen Mantis)
- Liturgusa milleri
- Liturgusa neblina
- Liturgusa nubeculosa
- Liturgusa purus
- Liturgusa stiewei
- Liturgusa tessae
- Liturgusa trinidadensis
- Liturgusa zoae

== Genus Liturgusella ==
- Liturgusella malagassa

== Genus Lobocneme ==
- Lobocneme colombiae
- Lobocneme icterica
- Lobocneme lobipes

== Genus Lobothespis ==
- Lobothespis vignai

== Genus Machairima ==
- Machairima papua

== Genus Macracanthopus ==
- Macracanthopus schoutedeni
- Macracanthopus seydeli

== Genus Macrodanuria ==
- Macrodanuria baculiformis
- Macrodanuria elongata
- Macrodanuria phasmoides

== Genus Macromusonia ==
- Macromusonia conspersa
- Macromusonia major

== Genus Macropopa ==
- Macropopa lobata

== Genus Maculatoscelis ==
- Maculatoscelis ascalaphoides
- Maculatoscelis gilloni
- Maculatoscelis maculata

== Genus Macromantis ==
All members of this genus are known as Amazon Giant Leaf Mantis.

- Macromantis hyalina
- Macromantis nicaraguae
- Macromantis ovalifolia
- Macromantis saussurei

== Genus Majanga ==
- Majanga basilaris
- Majanga spinosa
- Majanga tricolor

== Genus Majangella ==
- Majangella carli
- Majangella moultoni
- Majangella ophirensis

== Genus Mantasoa ==
- Mantasoa lebbei
- Mantasoa maculata

== Genus Mantellias ==
- Mantellias pubicornis

== Genus Mantilia ==
- Mantilia ehrmanni

== Genus Mantillica ==
- Mantillica nigricans

== Genus Mantis ==
- Mantis beieri
- Mantis callifera
- Mantis carinata
- Mantis dilaticollis
- Mantis emortualis
- Mantis griveaudi
- Mantis insignis
- Mantis macroalata
- Mantis macrocephala
- Mantis octospilota (Eight-spotted mantis, Eight-spot Mants, blackbarrel mantis)
- Mantis pia
- Mantis religiosa (European Mantis, European Praying Mantis, Praying Mantis)
- Mantis splendida
- Mantis tricolor

== Genus Mantoida ==
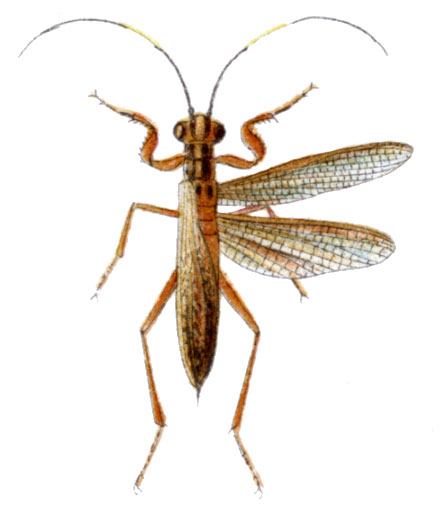
Mantoida nitida

This genus is concentrated in Mexico, Central America, and South America.

- Mantoida argentinae
- Mantoida beieri
- Mantoida brunneriana
- Mantoida burmeisteri
- Mantoida fulgidipennis
- †Mantoida matthiasglinki
- Mantoida maya (Little Yucatán mantis)
- Mantoida nitida
- Mantoida ronderosi
- Mantoida schraderi
- Mantoida tenuis

== Genus †Megaphotina ==
- †Megaphotina sichotensis

== Genus Mekongomantis ==
- Mekongomantis quinquespinosa

== Genus Melliera ==
- Melliera brevipes
- Melliera chorotega
- Melliera major
- Melliera mordax

== Genus Mellierella ==
- Mellierella biroi
- Mellierella trifasciata

== Genus Melomantis ==
- Melomantis africana
- Melomantis asema

== Genus Memantis ==
- Memantis anomala
- Memantis fuliginosa
- Memantis gardneri
- Memantis minor

== Genus Mesopteryx ==
- Mesopteryx alata (Saussure, 1870) (Taiwan Giant Grass Mantis)
- Mesopteryx platycephala (Stal, 1877)
- Mesopteryx robusta (Wood-Mason, 1882)

== Genus Metacromantis ==
- Metacromantis nigrofemorata
- Metacromantis oxyops

== Genus Metagalepsus ==
- Metagalepsus occidentalis
- Metagalepsus stramineus

== Genus Metallyticus ==
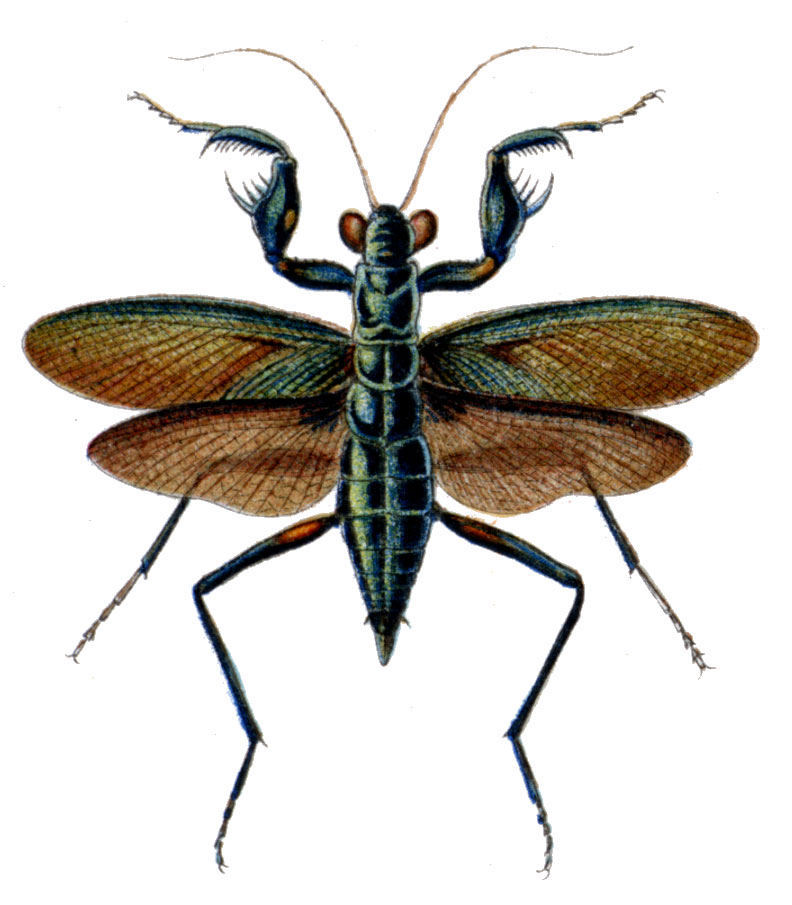
Metallyticus splendidus

- Metallyticus fallax
- Metallyticus pallipes
- Metallyticus semiaeneus
- Metallyticus splendidus (Iridescent Bark Mantis)
- Metallyticus violaceus

== Genus Metatoxodera ==
- Metatoxodera subparallela

== Genus Metilia ==
- Metilia amazonica (Beier, 1930)
- Metilia boliviana (Werner, 1927)
- Metilia brunnerii (Saussure, 1871)
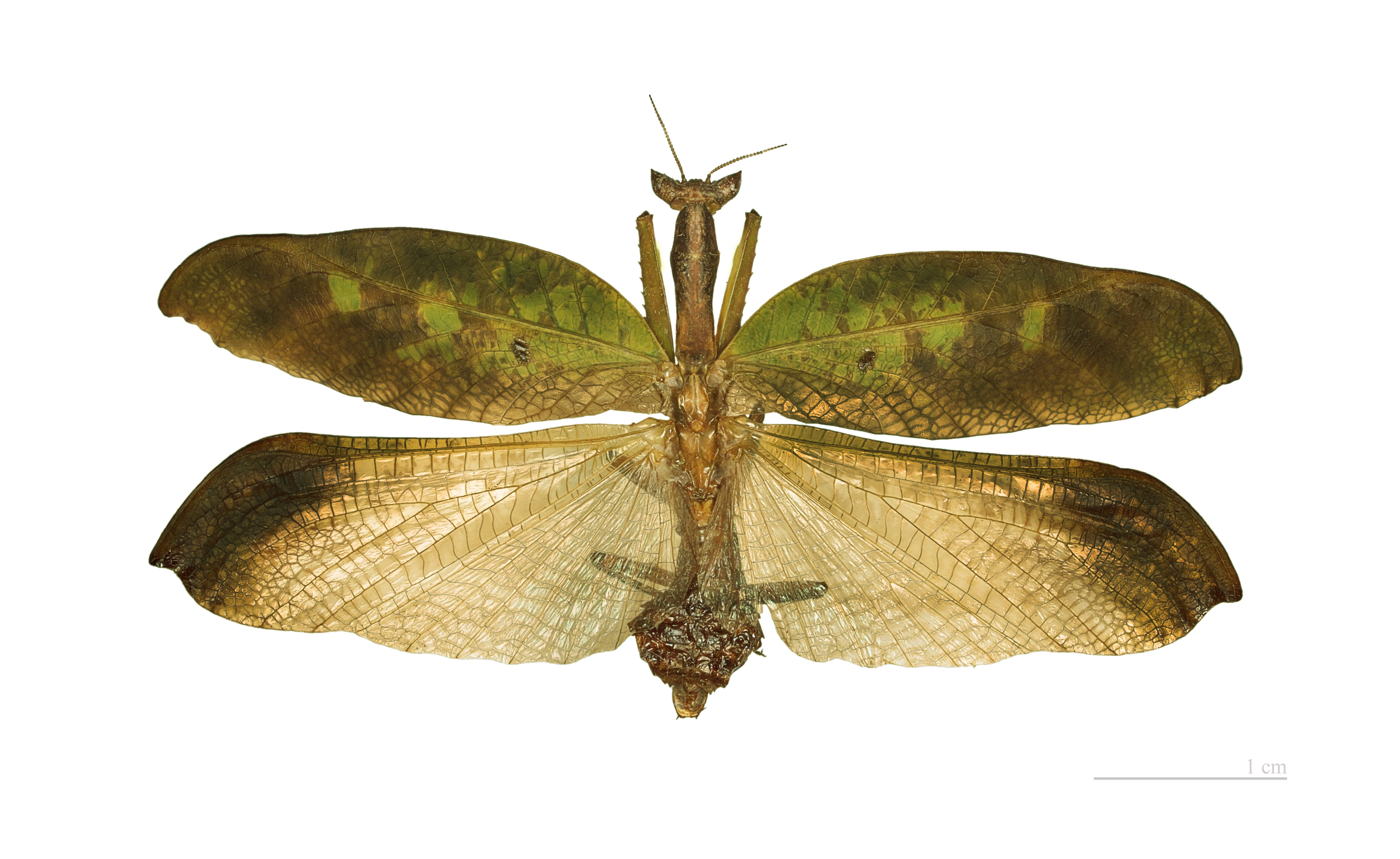
  Metilia brunnerii

== Genus Metoxypilus ==
- Metoxypilus costalis
- Metoxypilus lobifrons
- Metoxypilus werneri

== Genus Metriomantis ==
- Metriomantis amazonica
- Metriomantis boliviana
- Metriomantis cupido
- Metriomantis occidentalis
- Metriomantis paraensis
- Metriomantis Photinaina
- Metriomantis pilosella
- Metriomantis vitrea

== Genus Micromantis ==
- Micromantis glauca

== Genus Microphotina ==
- Microphotina cristalino Lanna et al., 2023
- Microphotina panguanensis
- Microphotina viridescens
- Microphotina viridula
- Microphotina vitripennis

== Genus Microthespis ==
- Microthespis dmitriewi
- Microthespis evansi
- Microthespis sindhensis

== Genus Miobantia ==
- Miobantia aptera
- Miobantia ciliata
- Miobantia fuscata
- Miobantia nebulosa
- Miobantia phryganea
- Miobantia rustica

== Genus Miomantis ==
- Miomantis abyssinica (Egyptian mantis, Ethiopian mantis)
- Miomantis acutipes
- Miomantis aequalis
- Miomantis affinis
- Miomantis alata
- Miomantis amanica
- Miomantis andreinii
- Miomantis annulipes
- Miomantis arabica
- Miomantis asignata
- Miomantis aurantiaca
- Miomantis aurea
- Miomantis australis
- Miomantis binotata (African Pinstripe Mantis)
- Miomantis bintumanensis
- Miomantis brachyptera
- Miomantis brevipennis
- Miomantis brunni
- Miomantis buettneri
- Miomantis caffra (South African mantis, springbok mantis)
- Miomantis cinnabarina
- Miomantis ciprianii
- Miomantis coxalis
- Miomantis devylderi
- Miomantis diademata
- Miomantis exilis
- Miomantis fallax
- Miomantis feminina
- Miomantis fenestrata
- Miomantis gracilis
- Miomantis griffinii
- Miomantis gyldenstolpei
- Miomantis helenae
- Miomantis kibweziana
- Miomantis kilimandjarica
- Miomantis lacualis
- Miomantis lamtoensis
- Miomantis longicollis
- Miomantis menelikii
- Miomantis milmilena
- Miomantis minuta
- Miomantis misana
- Miomantis moerana
- Miomantis mombasica
- Miomantis monacha
- Miomantis montana
- Miomantis multipunctata
- Miomantis nairobiensis
- Miomantis natalica
- Miomantis nyassensis
- Miomantis ornata

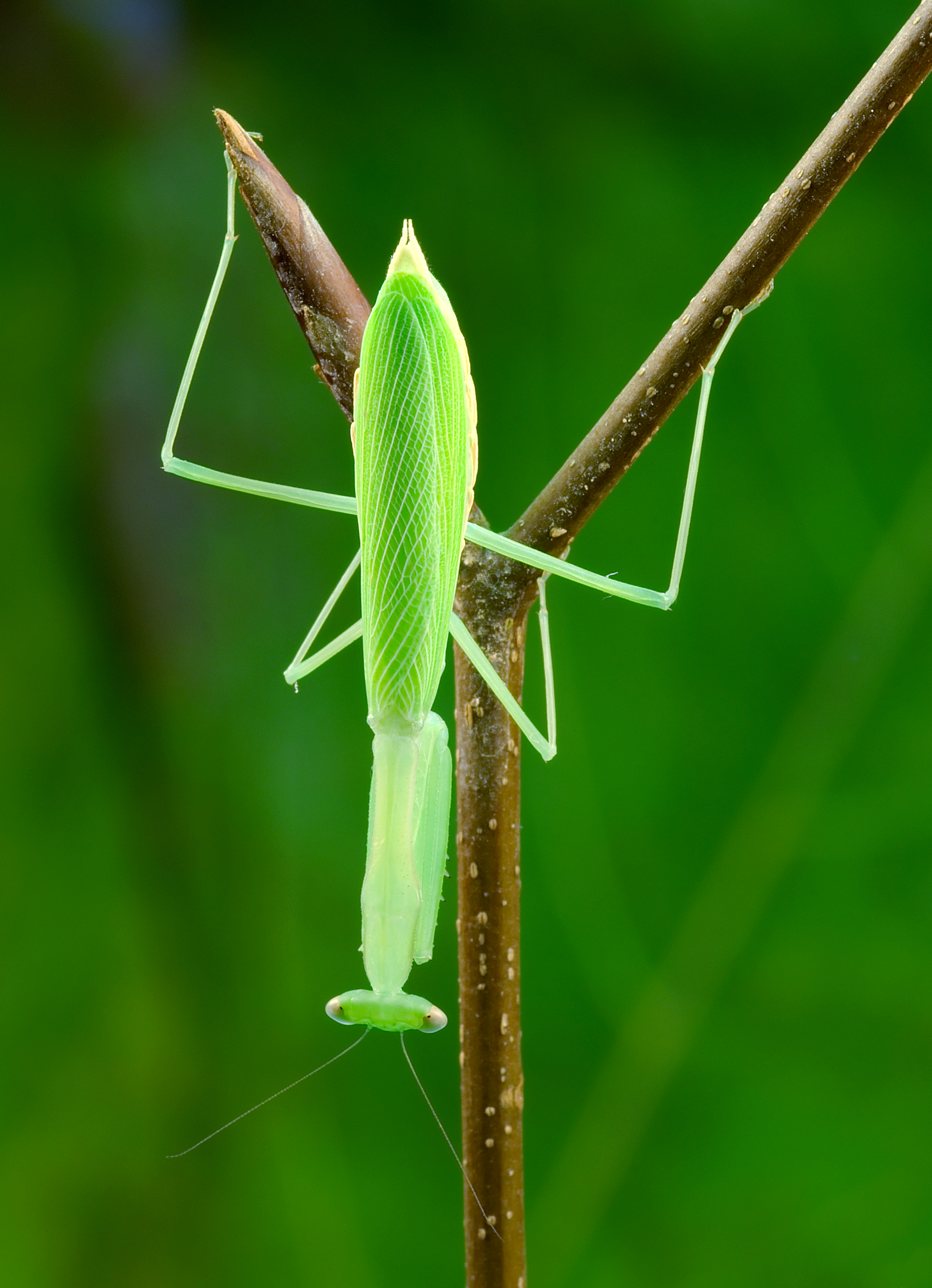
Miomantis paykullii

- Miomantis paykullii (Egyptian mantis, Egyptian Praying Mantis, Egyptian Pygmy Mantis)
- Miomantis pellucida
- Miomantis planivertex
- Miomantis prasina
- Miomantis preussi
- Miomantis pygmaea
- Miomantis quadripunctata
- Miomantis rebeli
- Miomantis rehni
- Miomantis rouxi
- Miomantis rubra
- Miomantis sangarana
- Miomantis saussurei
- Miomantis scabricollis
- Miomantis semialata
- Miomantis sjostedti
- Miomantis steelae
- Miomantis tangana
- Miomantis tenuis
- Miomantis usambarica
- Miomantis vitrea
- Miomantis wittei

== Genus Miracanthops ==
- Miracanthops eseejja
- Miracanthops lombardoi
- Miracanthops poulaini

== Genus Miromantis ==
- Miromantis mirandula
- Miromantis thalassina
- Miromantis yunnanensis

== Genus Muscimantis ==
- Muscimantis montana

== Genus Musonia ==
- Musonia boliviana
- Musonia costalis
- Musonia fuscescens
- Musonia lineata
- Musonia maculata
- Musonia seclusa
- Musonia sexdentata
- Musonia surinama

== Genus Musoniella ==
- Musoniella affinis
- Musoniella argentina
- Musoniella brasiliensis
- Musoniella chopardi
- Musoniella fragilis
- Musoniella iparanga
- Musoniella laevithorax
- Musoniella longicauda
- Musoniella parva
- Musoniella precaria

== Genus Musoniola ==
- Musoniola conservatrix
- Musoniola dohrniana
- Musoniola venezuelana
- Musoniola vicina

== Genus Myrcinus ==
- Myrcinus aspera
- Myrcinus octispinus
- Myrcinus tuberosus

== Genus Myrmecomantis ==
The single species in this genus is an ant mantis.

Myrmecomantis atra

- Myrmecomantis atra (ant mantis)

== Genus Mythomantis ==
- Mythomantis confusa
- Mythomantis gracilis
- Mythomantis serrata

== Genus Namamantis ==
- Namamantis nigropunctata

== Genus Nannofulcinia ==
- Nannofulcinia pulchra

== Genus Nanomantis ==
- Nanomantis australis
- Nanomantis gilolae
- Nanomantis lactea
- Nanomantis yunnanensis

== Genus Nausicaamantis ==
- Nausicaamantis miyazakii

== Genus Negromantis ==
- Negromantis gracilis
- Negromantis gracillima
- Negromantis lutescens
- Negromantis milloti
- Negromantis modesta

== Genus Nemotha ==
- Nemotha metallica

== Genus Neocilnia ==
- Neocilnia gracilis

== Genus Neodanuria ==
- Neodanuria bolauana
- Neodanuria simonettai

== Genus Neomantis ==
Neomantis australis

- Neomantis australis (Net-winged Mantis)
- Neomantis hyalina
- Neomantis robusta

== Genus Nesogalepsus ==
- Nesogalepsus andasibensis
- Nesogalepsus anovensis
- Nesogalepsus enigmaticus
- Nesogalepsus hova
- Nesogalepsus mandenensis
- Nesogalepsus moulini
- Nesogalepsus schuettei

== Genus Nesoxypilus ==
- Nesoxypilus albomaculatus
- Nesoxypilus pseudomyrmex

== Genus Nilomantis ==
- Nilomantis edmundsi
- Nilomantis floweri

== Genus Nothogalepsus ==
- Nothogalepsus planivertex

== Genus Notomantis ==
- Notomantis brunneriana
- Notomantis chlorophana

== Genus Nullabora ==
- Nullabora flavoguttata

== Genus Odontomantis ==
Some members of this genus practice ant mimicry when young and are known as ant mantises. The name grass mantis has also been applied to some species.

- Odontomantis brachyptera
- Odontomantis buehleri
- Odontomantis chayuensis
- Odontomantis euphrosyne
- Odontomantis foveafrons
- Odontomantis hainana
- Odontomantis laticollis
- Odontomantis longipennis
- Odontomantis micans (Ant Mantis)
- Odontomantis montana
- Odontomantis monticola
- Odontomantis nigrimarginalis
- Odontomantis ornata
- Odontomantis parva
- Odontomantis planiceps (Asian Ant mantis, Grass mantis)
- Odontomantis pulchra
- Odontomantis rhyssa
- Odontomantis sinensis
- Odontomantis xizangensis

== Genus Oestomantis ==
- Oestomantis anoplonotus
- Oestomantis bacillaris

== Genus Oligocanthopus ==
- Oligocanthopus ornata

== Genus Oligomantis ==
- Oligomantis hyalina
- Oligomantis mentaweiana
- Oligomantis orientalis

== Genus Oligonicella ==
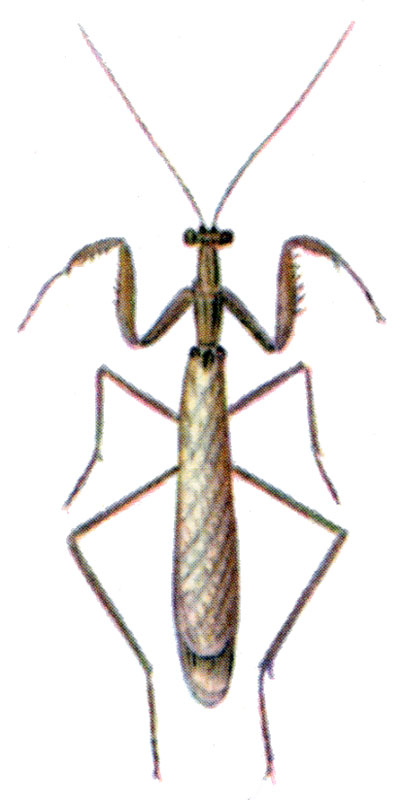
Oligonicella bolliana

- Oligonicella bolliana
- Oligonicella brunneri
- Oligonicella punctulata
- Oligonicella scudderi
- Oligonicella striolata
- Oligonicella tessellata

== Genus Oligonyx ==
- Oligonyx bicornis
- Oligonyx bidens
- Oligonyx dohrnianus
- Oligonyx insularis
- Oligonyx maya

== Genus Omomantis ==
- Omomantis sigma
- Omomantis tigrina (Tiger Mantis)
- Omomantis zebrata (Zebra Mantis)

== Genus Orthodera ==
- Orthodera australiana
- Orthodera burmeisteri
- Orthodera gracilis
- Orthodera gunni
- Orthodera insularis
- Orthodera ministralis (Garden mantis, Australian Garden Mantis)
- Orthodera novaezealandiae (New Zealand mantis)
- Orthodera rubrocoxata
- Orthodera timorensis

== Genus Orthoderella ==
- Orthoderella deluchii
- Orthoderella elongata
- Orthoderella major
- Orthoderella ornata

== Genus Orthoderina ==
- Orthoderina fergusoniana
- Orthoderina straminea

== Genus Ormomantis ==
- Ormomantis indica

== Genus Otomantis ==
Some species within this genus are known as boxer mantises.

- Otomantis aurita
- Otomantis bolivari
- Otomantis capirica
- Otomantis casaica
- Otomantis centralis
- Otomantis minima
- Otomantis rendalli
- Otomantis scutigera
- Otomantis trimacula

== Genus Ovalimantis ==
- Ovalimantis maculata

== Genus Oxyelaea ==
- Oxyelaea elegans
- Oxyelaea heteromorpha
- Oxyelaea stefaniae

== Genus Oxymantis ==
- Oxymantis punctillata

== Genus Oxyophthalma ==
- Oxyophthalma engaea
- Oxyophthalma gracilis

== Genus Oxyophthalmellus ==
- Oxyophthalmellus rehni
- Oxyophthalmellus somalicus

== Genus Oxyopsis ==
- Oxyopsis acutipennis
- Oxyopsis festae
- Oxyopsis gracilis (South American green mantis)
- Oxyopsis lobeter
- Oxyopsis media
- Oxyopsis obtusa
- Oxyopsis oculea
- Oxyopsis peruviana (Peruvian Mantis)
- Oxyopsis rubicunda
- Oxyopsis saussurei
- Oxyopsis stali

== Genus Oxyothespis ==
Members of this genus have been called grass mantises.

- Oxyothespis acuticeps
- Oxyothespis alata
- Oxyothespis apostata
- Oxyothespis bifurcata
- Oxyothespis brevicollis
- Oxyothespis brevipennis
- Oxyothespis dumonti (North African grass mantis)
- Oxyothespis flavipennis
- Oxyothespis longicollis
- Oxyothespis longipennis
- Oxyothespis mammillata
- Oxyothespis maroccana
- Oxyothespis meridionalis
- Oxyothespis nilotica
- Oxyothespis noctivaga
- Oxyothespis parva
- Oxyothespis pellucida
- Oxyothespis persica
- Oxyothespis philbyi
- Oxyothespis senegalensis
- Oxyothespis sudanensis
- Oxyothespis tricolor
- Oxyothespis villiersi
- Oxyothespis wagneri

== Genus Oxypiloidea ==
- Oxypiloidea acuminata
- Oxypiloidea angolica
- Oxypiloidea brunneriana
- Oxypiloidea camerunensis
- Oxypiloidea carvalhoi
- Oxypiloidea centrafricana
- Oxypiloidea congica
- Oxypiloidea dargei
- Oxypiloidea denticulata
- Oxypiloidea granulata
- Oxypiloidea ivoirensis
- Oxypiloidea jeanneli
- Oxypiloidea lobata
- Oxypiloidea maldesi
- Oxypiloidea margarethae
- Oxypiloidea maroccana
- Oxypiloidea mortuifolia
- Oxypiloidea murphyi
- Oxypiloidea namibiana
- Oxypiloidea nigerica
- Oxypiloidea occidentalis
- Oxypiloidea orientalis
- Oxypiloidea sinuata
- Oxypiloidea tridens
- Oxypiloidea zernyi
- Oxypiloidea nigerica

== Genus Oxypilus ==
- Oxypilus annulatus
- Oxypilus burri
- Oxypilus capensis
- Oxypilus cherlonneixi
- Oxypilus descampsi
- Oxypilus enei
- Oxypilus falcatus
- Oxypilus flavicoxa
- Oxypilus gillonae
- Oxypilus hamatus
- Oxypilus inscriptus
- Oxypilus lamottei
- Oxypilus maculifemur
- Oxypilus meruensis
- Oxypilus montanus
- Oxypilus pallidus
- Oxypilus pierrei
- Oxypilus polyacanthus
- Oxypilus raggei
- Oxypilus servillei
- Oxypilus tanzanicus
- Oxypilus transvalensis
- Oxypilus villiersi

== Genus Pachymantis ==
Pachymantis bicingulata

- Pachymantis bicingulata
- Pachymantis dohertyi
- Pachymantis maculicoxa
- Pachymantis piceifemur

== Genus Panurgica ==
- Panurgica basilewskyi
- Panurgica compressicollis
- Panurgica duplex
- Panurgica feae
- Panurgica fratercula
- Panurgica fusca
- Panurgica langi
- Panurgica liberiana
- Panurgica mende
- Panurgica rehni

== Genus Papubolbe ==
- Papubolbe curvidens
- Papubolbe eximia
- Papubolbe flava
- Papubolbe gressitti
- Papubolbe longipennis
- Papubolbe picea

== Genus Papugalepsus ==
- Papugalepsus alatus
- Papugalepsus elongatus

== Genus Parablepharis ==
- Parablepharis kuhlii (Vietnamese Ghost Mantis, Darth Vader Mantis)

== Genus Paracilnia ==
- Paracilnia neavei

== Genus Paradiabantia ==
- Paradiabantia perparva

== Genus Paragalepsus ==
- Paragalepsus bassari
- Paragalepsus gestri
- Paragalepsus nigericus
- Paragalepsus oxyops
- Paragalepsus toganus
- Paragalepsus vrydaghi

== Genus Parahestiasula ==
- Parahestiasula obscura

== Genus Paraligaria ==
- Paraligaria malawica

== Genus Paralygdamia ==
- Paralygdamia fisheri
- Paralygdamia gigliotosi
- Paralygdamia grandidieri
- Paralygdamia ifatyensis
- Paralygdamia madagascariensis
- Paralygdamia madecassa
- Paralygdamia nosyensis
- Paralygdamia punctata
- Paralygdamia sikorai
- Paralygdamia wintreberti

== Genus Paramantis ==
- Paramantis natalensis
- Paramantis nyassana
- Paramantis prasina
- Paramantis sacra
- Paramantis togana
- Paramantis victoriana
- Paramantis viridis

== Genus Paramantoida ==
- Paramantoida amazonica

== Genus Paramorphoscelis ==
- Paramorphoscelis gondokorensis

== Genus Paramusonia ==
- Paramusonia cubensis

== Genus Parananomantis ==
- Parananomantis brevis

== Genus Paraoxypilus ==
- Paraoxypilus armatus
- Paraoxypilus distinctus
- Paraoxypilus flavifemur
- Paraoxypilus insularis
- Paraoxypilus kimberleyensis
- Paraoxypilus laticollis
- Paraoxypilus tasmaniensis
- Paraoxypilus verreauxii

== Genus Paraphotina ==
- Paraphotina caatingaensis
- Paraphotina insolita
- Paraphotina occidentalis
- Paraphotina reticulata

== Genus Parapsychomantis ==
- Parapsychomantis vietnamensis

== Genus Pararivetina ==
- Pararivetina fraseri

== Genus Paraseverinia ==
- Paraseverinia finoti

== Genus Parasphendale ==
All members of this genus are known as Budwing Mantis due to their short, vestigial wings in females.

- Parasphendale affinis (Budwing Mantis)
- Parasphendale africana
- Parasphendale agrionina (Budwing Mantis)
- Parasphendale albicosta
- Parasphendale arabukosokokei
- Parasphendale costalis
- Parasphendale ghindana
- Parasphendale gracilicollis
- Parasphendale minor
- Parasphendale scioana
- Parasphendale stali
- Parasphendale vincta

== Genus Parastagmatoptera ==
- Parastagmatoptera bororoi
- Parastagmatoptera flavoguttata
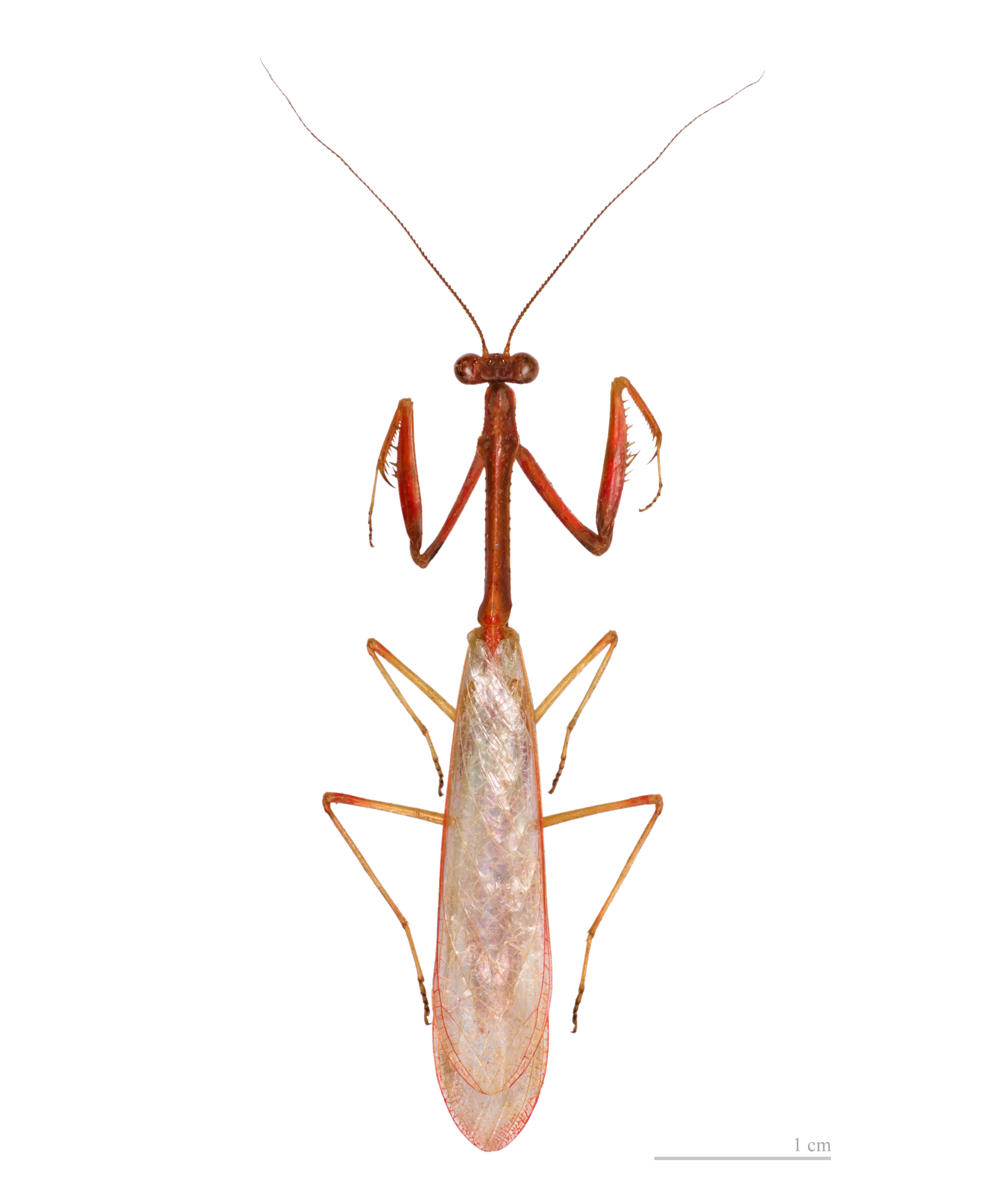
  Parastagmatoptera flavoguttata
- Parastagmatoptera immaculata
- Parastagmatoptera pellucida
- Parastagmatoptera simulacrum
- Parastagmatoptera sottilei
- Parastagmatoptera theresopolitana
- Parastagmatoptera unipunctata
- Parastagmatoptera vitreola
- Parastagmatoptera zernyi

== Genus Paratheopompa ==
- Paratheopompa siamensis

== Genus Parathespis ==
- Parathespis humbertiana

== Genus Paratithrone ==
- Paratithrone royi

== Genus Paratoxodera ==
Paratoxodera is a genus of stick mantises.

- Paratoxodera borneana (Borneo stick mantis)
- Paratoxodera cornicollis (Giant Malaysian stick mantis)
- Paratoxodera gigliotosi
- Paratoxodera marshallae
- Paratoxodera meggitti
- Paratoxodera polyacantha

== Genus Parentella ==
- Parentella benguelae
- Parentella laticollis
- Parentella major
- Parentella parva
- Parentella producta

== Genus Pareuthyphlebs ==
- Pareuthyphlebs arabica
- Pareuthyphlebs occidentalis
- Pareuthyphlebs palmonii
- Pareuthyphlebs popovi
- Pareuthyphlebs scorteccii
- Pareuthyphlebs somalica
- Pareuthyphlebs uvarovi

== Genus Paroxyophthalmus ==
Paroxyophthalmus collaris

- Paroxyophthalmus collaris
- Paroxyophthalmus nigericus
- Paroxyophthalmus ornatus
- Paroxyophthalmus savatieri

== Genus Perlamantis ==
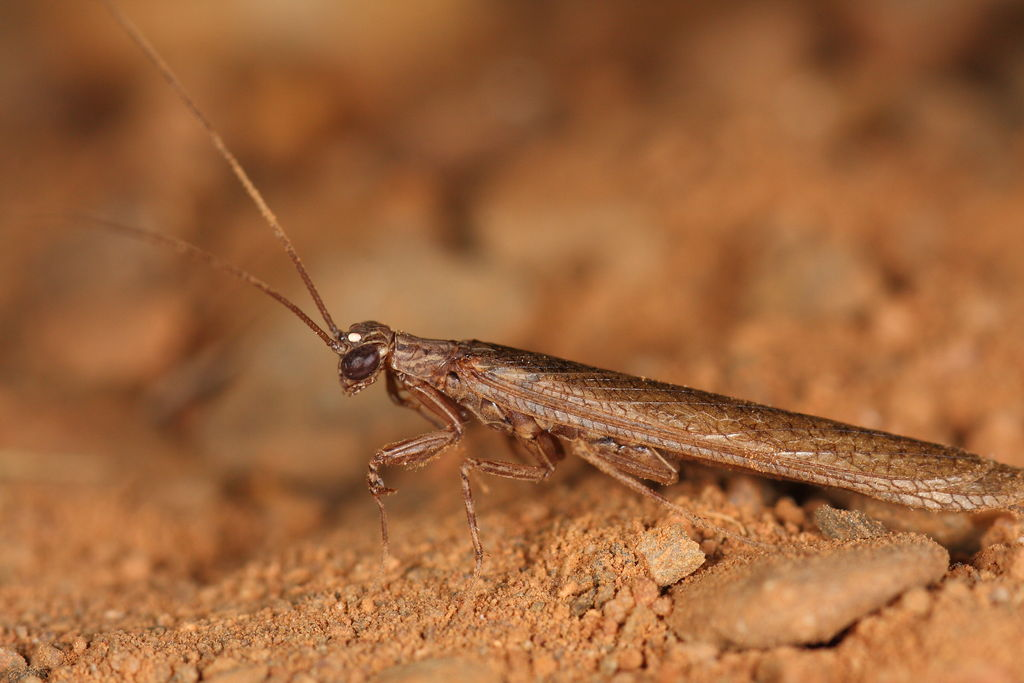
Perlamantis allibertii

- Perlamantis algerica
- Perlamantis allibertii

== Genus Pezomantis ==
- Pezomantis henryi

== Genus Phasmomantella ==
- Phasmomantella nuichuana
- Phasmomantella pallida

== Genus Phasmomantis ==
- Phasmomantis basalis (Giglio-Tos, 1917)
- Phasmomantis sumichrasti (Saussure, 1861) (Giant Mexican Mantis)

== Genus Photina ==
- Photina amplipennis
- Photina gracilis
- Photina ludens
- Photina reticulata
- Photina vitrea

== Genus Photinella ==
- Photinella biramosa
- Photinella brevis
- Photinella magna
- Photinella media

== Genus Photiomantis ==
- Photiomantis glauca
- Photiomantis nigrolineata
- Photiomantis planicephala

== Genus Phthersigena ==
Phthersigena conspersa

- Phthersigena centralis
- Phthersigena conspersa
- Phthersigena insularis
- Phthersigena melania
- Phthersigena minor
- Phthersigena pallidifemur
- Phthersigena nebulosa
- Phthersigena timorensis
- Phthersigena unicornis

== Genus Phyllocrania ==
- Phyllocrania illudens (Saussure & Zehntner, 1895) (Madagascar Ghost Mantis)
- Phyllocrania insignis (Westwood, 1843)
- Phyllocrania paradoxa (Burmeister, 1838) (Ghost Mantis, Common Ghost Mantis)

== Genus Phyllothelys ==
Members of this genus are sometimes called "Enigmatic Mantis"

- Phyllothelys bakeri
- Phyllothelys breve
- Phyllothelys cornutus
- Phyllothelys decipiens
- Phyllothelys hepaticus
- Phyllothelys jianfenglingensis
- Phyllothelys mitratum
- Phyllothelys paradoxum
- Phyllothelys robusta
- Phyllothelys sinensis
- Phyllothelys taprobanae
- Phyllothelys werneri
- Phyllothelys westwoodi

== Genus Pilomantis ==
- Pilomantis fusca

== Genus Piscomantis ==
- Piscomantis peruana

== Genus Pizaia ==
- Pizaia seabrai

== Genus Plastogalepsus ==
- Plastogalepsus kuhlgatzi

== Genus Plesiacanthops ==
- Phyllovates tuberculata

== Genus Platycalymma ==
- Platycalymma annulicornis
- Platycalymma befasica
- Platycalymma dichroica
- Platycalymma latipennis
- Platycalymma mahafalica
- Platycalymma viettei

== Genus Pliacanthopus ==
- Pliacanthopus bimaculatus
- Pliacanthopus flavus
- Pliacanthopus malayanus
- Pliacanthopus mantispoides
- Pliacanthopus visayanus

== Genus Plistospilota ==
- Plistospilota camerunensis
- Plistospilota congica
- Plistospilota gasconi
- Plistospilota guineensis (West African Mega Mantis, Mega Mantis)
- Plistospilota insignis
- Plistospilota mabirica
- Plistospilota maxima
- Plistospilota nigerica
- Plistospilota validissima

== Genus Pnigomantis ==
This genus has a species of shield mantis.

- Pnigomantis medioconstricta (Indonesia double shield mantis, Double Shield Mantis)

== Genus Pogonogaster ==
- Pogonogaster latens
- Pogonogaster tristani

== Genus Polyspilota ==
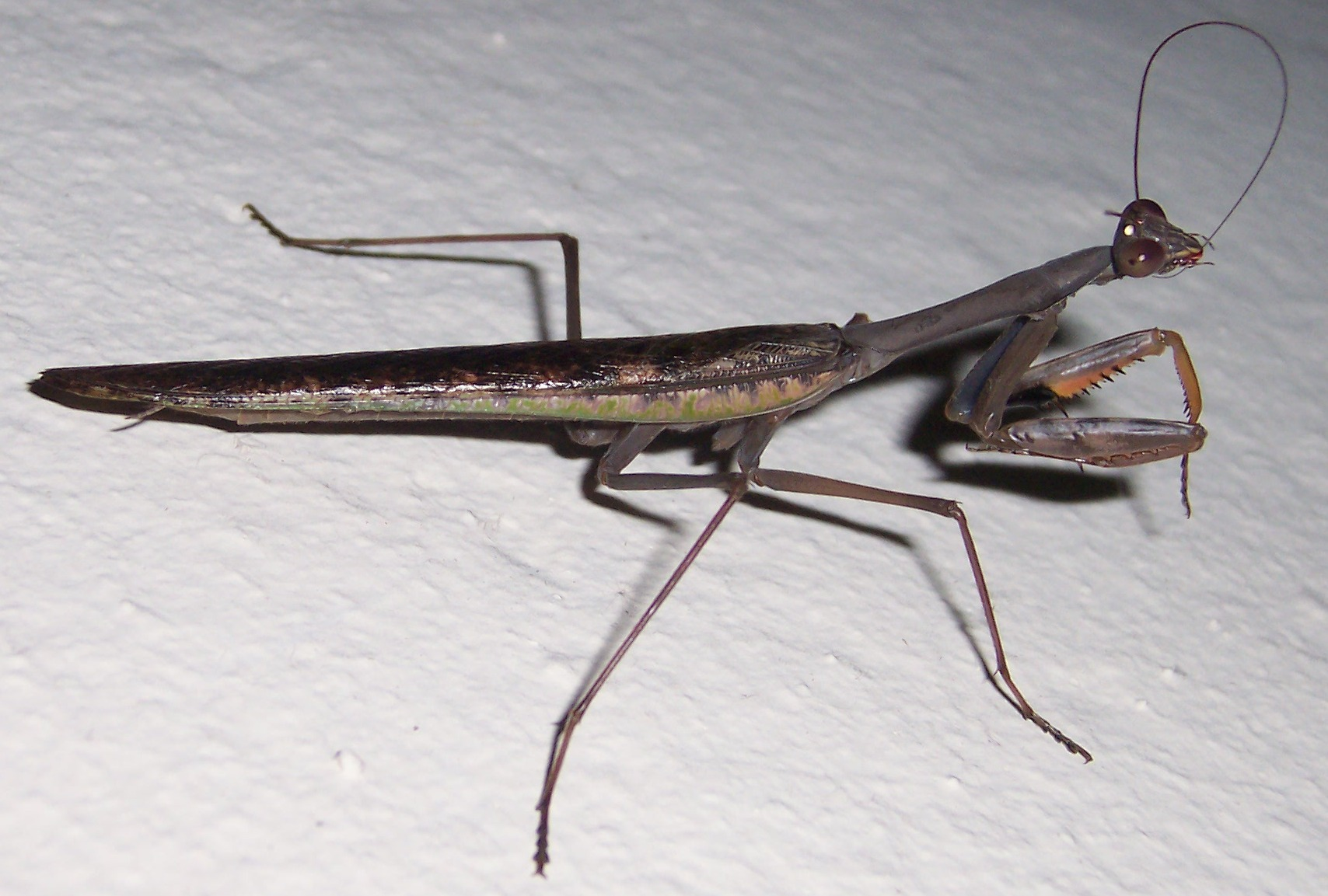
Polyspilota aeruginosa, the Madagascan marbled mantis

- Polyspilota aeruginosa (Flag Mantis, Madagascan Marbled Mantis)
- Polyspilota caffra
- Polyspilota comorana
- Polyspilota griffinii (Griffin mantis, Griffin's Mantis)
- Polyspilota magna
- Polyspilota montana
- Polyspilota pavani
- Polyspilota robusta
- Polyspilota saussurei
- Polyspilota seychelliana
- Polyspilota voelzkowiana

== Genus Popa ==
- Popa gracilis
- Popa spurca (African twig mantis) - a species of twig mantis popular in captivity.

== Genus Presibylla ==
- Presibylla elegans
- Presibylla speciosa

== Genus †Prochaeradodis ==
- †Prochaeradodis enigmaticus

This genus likely represents a cockroach belonging to the family Blaberidae.

== Genus Prohierodula ==
- Prohierodula brunnea
- Prohierodula congica
- Prohierodula duchaillui
- Prohierodula enghoffi
- Prohierodula flavipennis
- Prohierodula grassei
- Prohierodula laticollis
- Prohierodula lineata
- Prohierodula mundamensis
- Prohierodula nigrispinis
- Prohierodula ornatipennis
- Prohierodula picta (Joker Mantis)
- Prohierodula viridimarginata

== Genus Promiopteryx ==
- Promiopteryx fallax
- Promiopteryx granadensis
- Promiopteryx punctata
- Promiopteryx simplex
- Promiopteryx stigmatica

== Genus Protoxodera ==
- Protoxodera monstrosa

== Genus Pseudacanthops ==
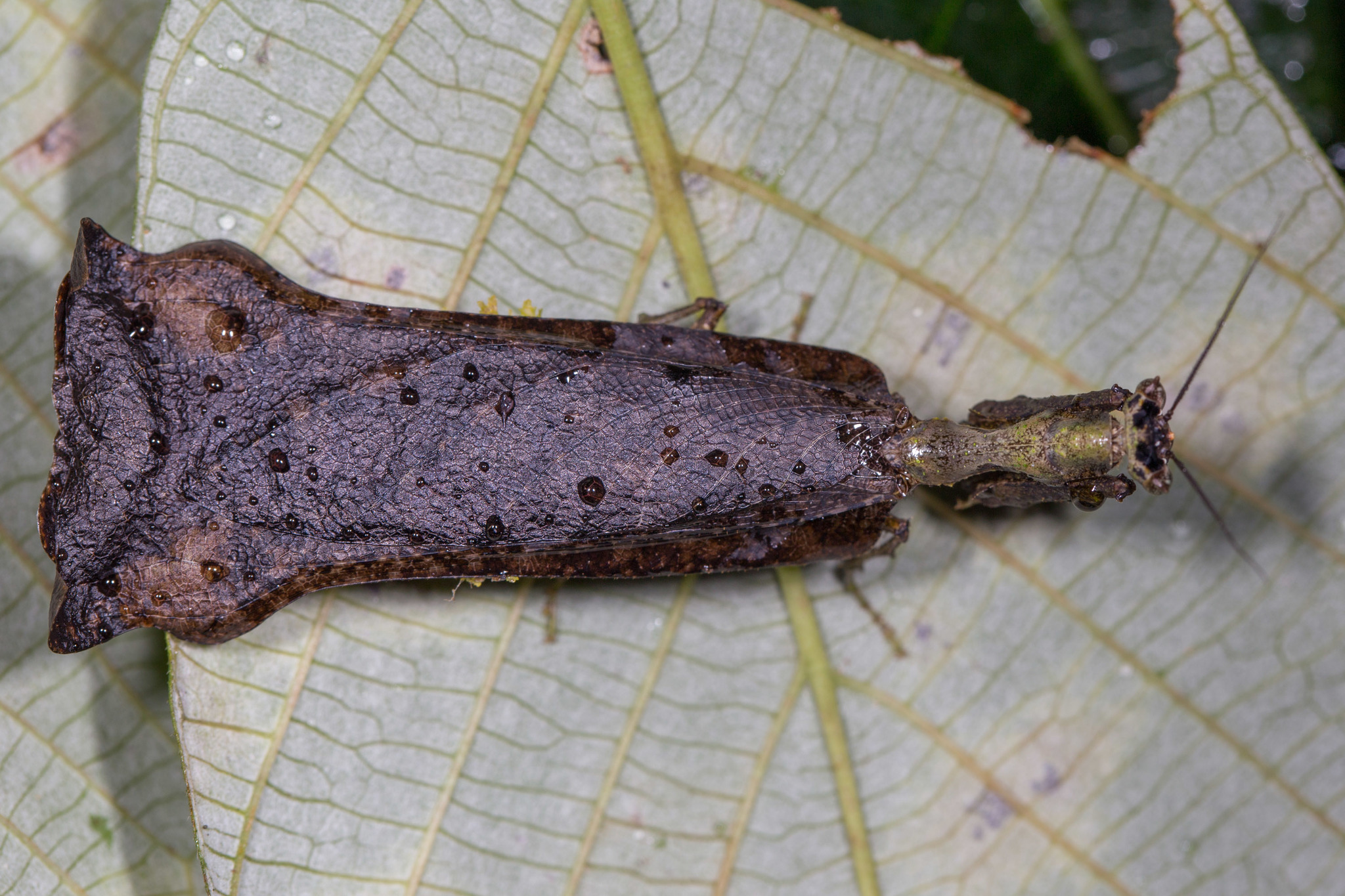
Pseudacanthops huaoranianus

- Pseudacanthops caelebs
- Pseudacanthops centralis
- Pseudacanthops clorindae
- Pseudacanthops huaoranianus
- Pseudacanthops lobipes
- Pseudacanthops spinulosa

== Genus Pseudempusa ==
- Pseudempusa pavonina
- Pseudempusa pinnapavonis (peacock mantis)

== Genus Pseudocreobotra ==
This genus contains several species of flower mantises.

- Pseudocreobotra amarae
- Pseudocreobotra ocellata (ocellated spiny flower mantis, spiny flower mantis)
- Pseudocreobotra wahlbergii (Walhbergi's spiny flower mantis, spiny flower mantis)

== Genus Pseudodystacta ==
- Pseudodystacta braueri

== Genus Pseudogalepsus ==
- Pseudogalepsus dispar
- Pseudogalepsus inermis
- Pseudogalepsus modestior
- Pseudogalepsus modestus
- Pseudogalepsus nigricoxa

== Genus Pseudoharpax ==
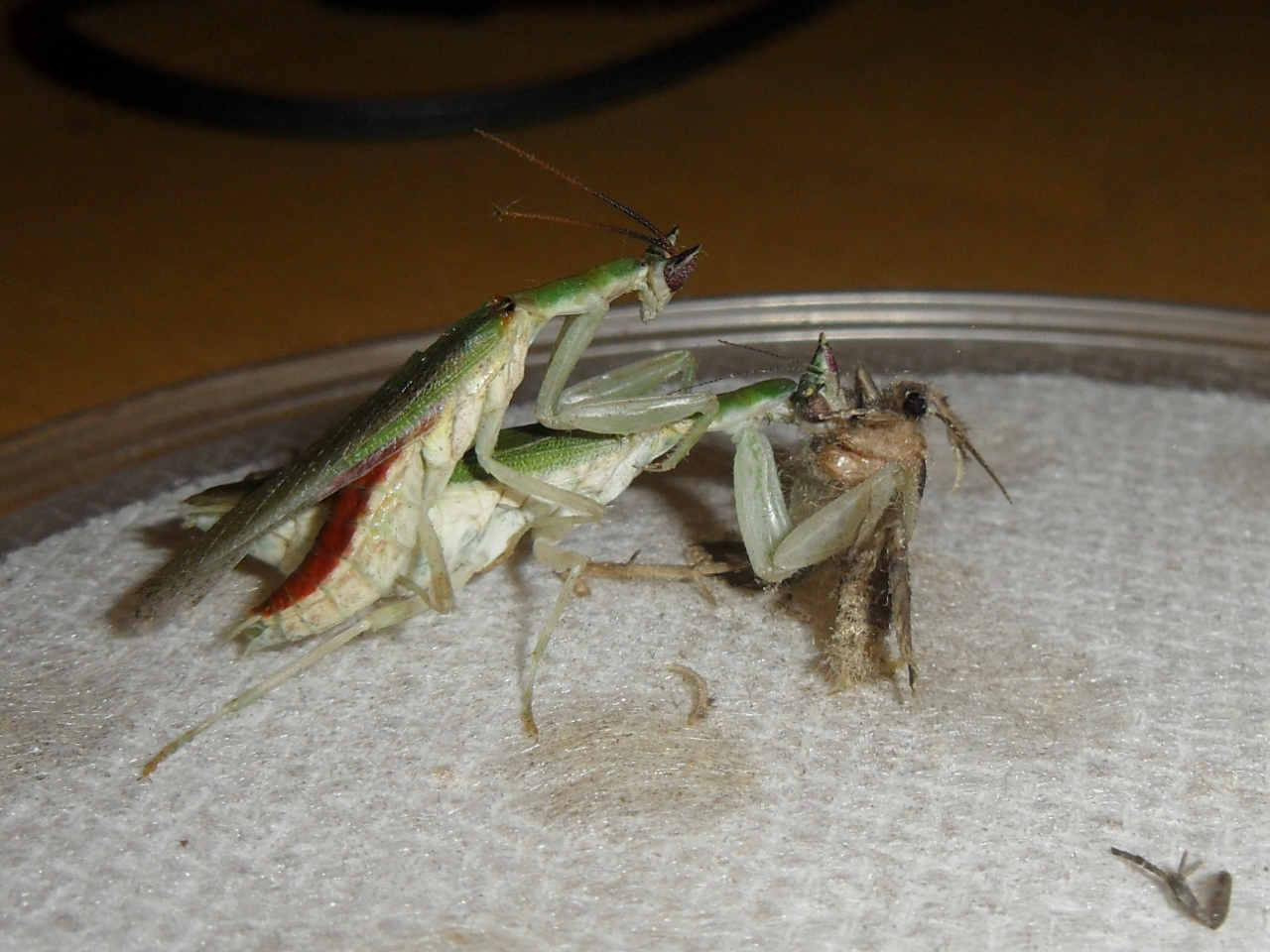
Pseudoharpax virescens mating

- Pseudoharpax abyssinicus (Beier, 1930)
- Pseudoharpax beieri (La Greca, 1950)
- Pseudoharpax crenaticollis (La Greca, 1954)
- Pseudoharpax dubius (La Greca, 1954)
- Pseudoharpax erythraeus (Giglio-Tos, 1915)
- Pseudoharpax francoisi (Bolivar, 1908)
- Pseudoharpax nigericus (Giglio-Tos, 1915)
- Pseudoharpax parallelus (La Greca, 1954)
- Pseudoharpax ugandanus (Giglio-Tos, 1915)
- Pseudoharpax virescens (Serville, 1839) (Gambian spotted-eye flower mantis )

== Genus Pseudohestiasula ==
- Pseudohestiasula borneana (Beier, 1930)

== Genus Pseudomantis ==
- Pseudomantis albofimbriata (Stal, 1860) (false garden mantis)
- Pseudomantis albomarginata (Sjostedt, 1918)
- Pseudomantis apicalis (Saussure, 1870)
- Pseudomantis dimorpha (Werner, 1912)
- Pseudomantis hartmeyeri (Werner, 1912)
- Pseudomantis maculata (Saussure, 1872)
- Pseudomantis victorina (Westwood, 1889)

== Genus Pseudomiopteryx ==
- Pseudomiopteryx amazonensis
- Pseudomiopteryx bogotensis
- Pseudomiopteryx columbica
- Pseudomiopteryx decipiens
- Pseudomiopteryx festae
- Pseudomiopteryx guyanensis
- Pseudomiopteryx infuscata
- Pseudomiopteryx maculata
- Pseudomiopteryx meridana
- Pseudomiopteryx spinifrons

== Genus Pseudomusonia ==
Pseudomusonia lineativentri

- Pseudomusonia carlottae
- Pseudomusonia fera
- Pseudomusonia lineativentris
- Pseudomusonia maculosa
- Pseudomusonia rapax

== Genus Pseudopogonogaster ==
- Pseudopogonogaster hebardi
- Pseudopogonogaster kanjaris
- Pseudopogonogaster mirabilis
- Pseudopogonogaster muscosa

== Genus Pseudostagmatoptera ==
- Pseudostagmatoptera infuscata

== Genus Pseudovates ==
Some species within this genus are known as unicorn mantises or stick mantises.

- Pseudovates arizonae (Arizona unicorn mantis)
- Pseudovates bidens
- Pseudovates brasiliensis
- Pseudovates brevicollis
- Pseudovates brevicornis
- Pseudovates chlorophaea (Texas Unicorn Mantis)
- Pseudovates cingulata
- Pseudovates cornuta
- Pseudovates denticulata
- Pseudovates gracilicollis
- Pseudovates hofmanni
- Pseudovates iheringi
- Pseudovates longicollis
- Pseudovates minor
- Pseudovates paraensis
- Pseudovates parallela
- Pseudovates peruviana (Peruvian Stick Mantis)
- Pseudovates parvula
- Pseudovates spinicollis
- Pseudovates stolli
- Pseudovates tolteca
- Pseudovates townsendi
- Pseudovates tripunctata

== Genus Pseudoxyops ==
- Pseudoxyops boliviana
- Pseudoxyops borellii
- Pseudoxyops diluta
- Pseudoxyops minuta
- Pseudoxyops perpulchra

== Genus Pseudoxypilus ==
- Pseudoxypilus hemerobius

== Genus Pseudoyersinia ==
- Pseudoyersinia andreae
- Pseudoyersinia betancuriae
- Pseudoyersinia brevipennis
- Pseudoyersinia canariensis
- Pseudoyersinia inaspectata
- Pseudoyersinia kabilica
- Pseudoyersinia lagrecai
- Pseudoyersinia occidentalis
- Pseudoyersinia paui
- Pseudoyersinia pilipes
- Pseudoyersinia salvinae
- Pseudoyersinia subaptera
- Pseudoyersinia teydeana

== Genus Psychomantis ==
- Psychomantis borneensis
- Psychomantis malayensis

== Genus Pyrgomantis ==
Pyrgomantis pallida

- Pyrgomantis bisignata
- Pyrgomantis congica
- Pyrgomantis curta
- Pyrgomantis fasciata
- Pyrgomantis jonesi
- Pyrgomantis longissima
- Pyrgomantis mabuia
- Pyrgomantis mitrata
- Pyrgomantis nana
- Pyrgomantis nasuta
- Pyrgomantis ornatipes
- Pyrgomantis pallida
- Pyrgomantis rhodesica
- Pyrgomantis runifera
- Pyrgomantis signatifrons
- Pyrgomantis simillima
- Pyrgomantis singularis
- Pyrgomantis wellmanni

== Genus Raptrix ==
- Raptrix intermedia
- Raptrix occidentalis
- Raptrix perspicua
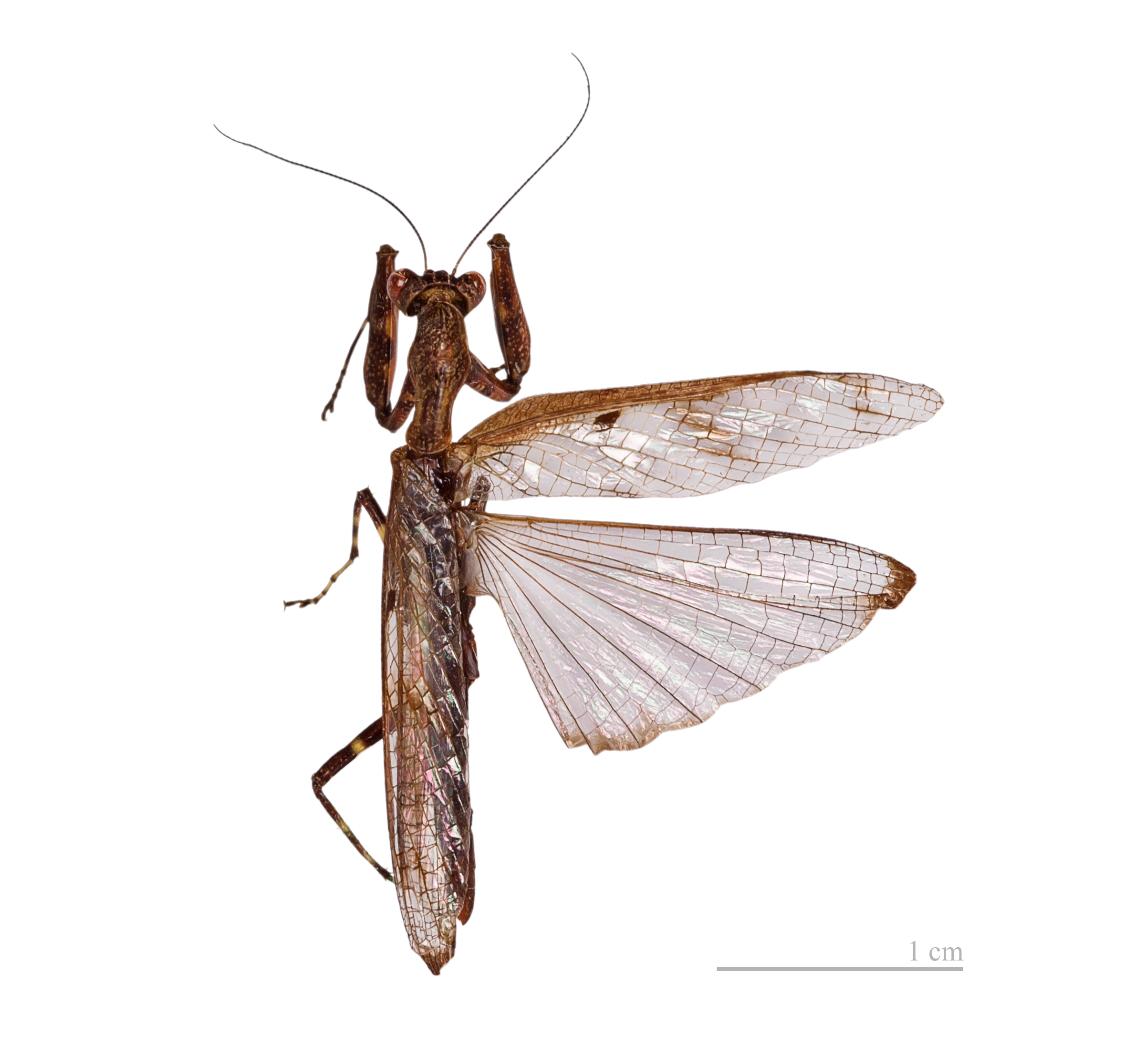
  Raptrix perspicua
- Raptrix westwoodi

== Genus Rhachimantis ==
- Rhachimantis carinata

== Genus Rhodomantis ==
- Rhodomantis disparilis
- Rhodomantis helenae
- Rhodomantis kimberley
- Rhodomantis macula
- Rhodomantis microptera
- Rhodomantis mitchell
- Rhodomantis napier
- Rhodomantis queenslandica
- Rhodomantis rentzi

== Genus Rhomantis ==
- Rhomantis moultoni

== Genus Rhombodera ==
Rhombodera is a large genus of shield mantises.

- Rhombodera basalis (Giant Malaysian shield mantis, Malaysian Shield Mantis)
- Rhombodera boschmai
- Rhombodera brachynota
- Rhombodera crassa
- Rhombodera doriana
- Rhombodera extensicollis (Diamond Shield Mantis)
- Rhombodera extraordinaria
- Rhombodera fratricida
- Rhombodera handschini
- Rhombodera javana
- Rhombodera keiana
- Rhombodera kirbyi (Timor Giant Shield Mantis, Timor Shield Mantis, Timor Island Shield Mantis)
- Rhombodera laticollis
- Rhombodera latipronotum
- Rhombodera lingulata
- Rhombodera megaera (Thai Giant Mantis)
- Rhombodera mjoebergi
- Rhombodera morokana
- Rhombodera ornatipes
- Rhombodera palawanensis
- Rhombodera papuana
- Rhombodera rennellana
- Rhombodera rollei
- Rhombodera sjoestedti
- Rhombodera stalii (Giant Shield Mantis, Indonesian Shield Mantis)
- Rhombodera taprobana
- Rhombodera titania
- Rhombodera valida
- Rhombodera zhangi

== Genus Rhomboderella ==
- Rhomboderella gabonica
- Rhomboderella parmata
- Rhomboderella scutata
- Rhomboderella thorectes

== Genus Rhombomantis ==
- Rhombomantis butleri
- Rhombomantis fusca
- Rhombomantis tectiformis
- Rhombomantis woodmasoni

== Genus Rivetina ==
Rivetina is a genus containing species of ground mantis.

- Rivetina asiatica
- Rivetina baetica (ground mantis)
- Rivetina balcanica
- Rivetina beybienkoi
- Rivetina buettikeri
- Rivetina byblica
- Rivetina caucasica
- Rivetina compacta
- Rivetina crassa
- Rivetina dentata
- Rivetina deserta
- Rivetina dolichoptera
- Rivetina elegans
- Rivetina excellens
- Rivetina fasciata
- Rivetina feisabadica
- Rivetina gigantea
- Rivetina gigas
- Rivetina grandis
- Rivetina inermis
- Rivetina iranica
- Rivetina karadumi
- Rivetina karateginica
- Rivetina laticollis
- Rivetina monticola
- Rivetina nana
- Rivetina pallida
- Rivetina parva
- Rivetina pulisangini
- Rivetina rhombicollis
- Rivetina similis
- Rivetina syriaca
- Rivetina tarda
- Rivetina varsobica

== Genus Rivetinula ==
- Rivetinula fraterna

== Genus Roythespis ==
- Roythespis israelensis Stiewe, Weinstein & Simon, 2025

== Genus Sceptuchus ==
- Sceptuchus baehri
- Sceptuchus simplex

== Genus Schizocephala ==
- Schizocephala bicornis (Indian Grass Mantis)

== Genus Scolodera ==
- Scolodera pardalotus

== Genus Severinia ==
- Severinia granulata
- Severinia lemoroi
- Severinia mistshenkoi
- Severinia nigrofasciata
- Severinia obscurus
- Severinia popovi
- Severinia turcomaniae
- Severinia ullrichi

== Genus Sibylla ==
  - Sibylla dives
  - Sibylla dolosa
  - Sibylla gratiosa
  - Sibylla griffinii
  - Sibylla limbata
  - Sibylla maculosa
  - Sibylla marmorata
  - Sibylla operosa
  - Sibylla pannulata
  - Sibylla polyacantha
  - Sibylla pretiosa (Cryptic mantis, Lichen mantis)
  - Sibylla punctata
  - Sibylla vanderplaetseni

== Genus Sinaiella ==
- Sinaiella nebulosa
- Sinaiella raggei
- Sinaiella sabulosa

== Genus Sinomantis ==
- Sinomantis denticulata

== Genus Sinomiopteryx ==
- Sinomiopteryx brevifrons
- Sinomiopteryx grahami
- Sinomiopteryx guangxiensis

== Genus Solygia ==
- Solygia sulcatifrons

== Genus Somalithespis ==
- Somalithespis minor

== Genus Sphaeromantis ==
- Sphaeromantis spinicollis
- Sphaeromantis spinulosa

== Genus Sphodromantis ==
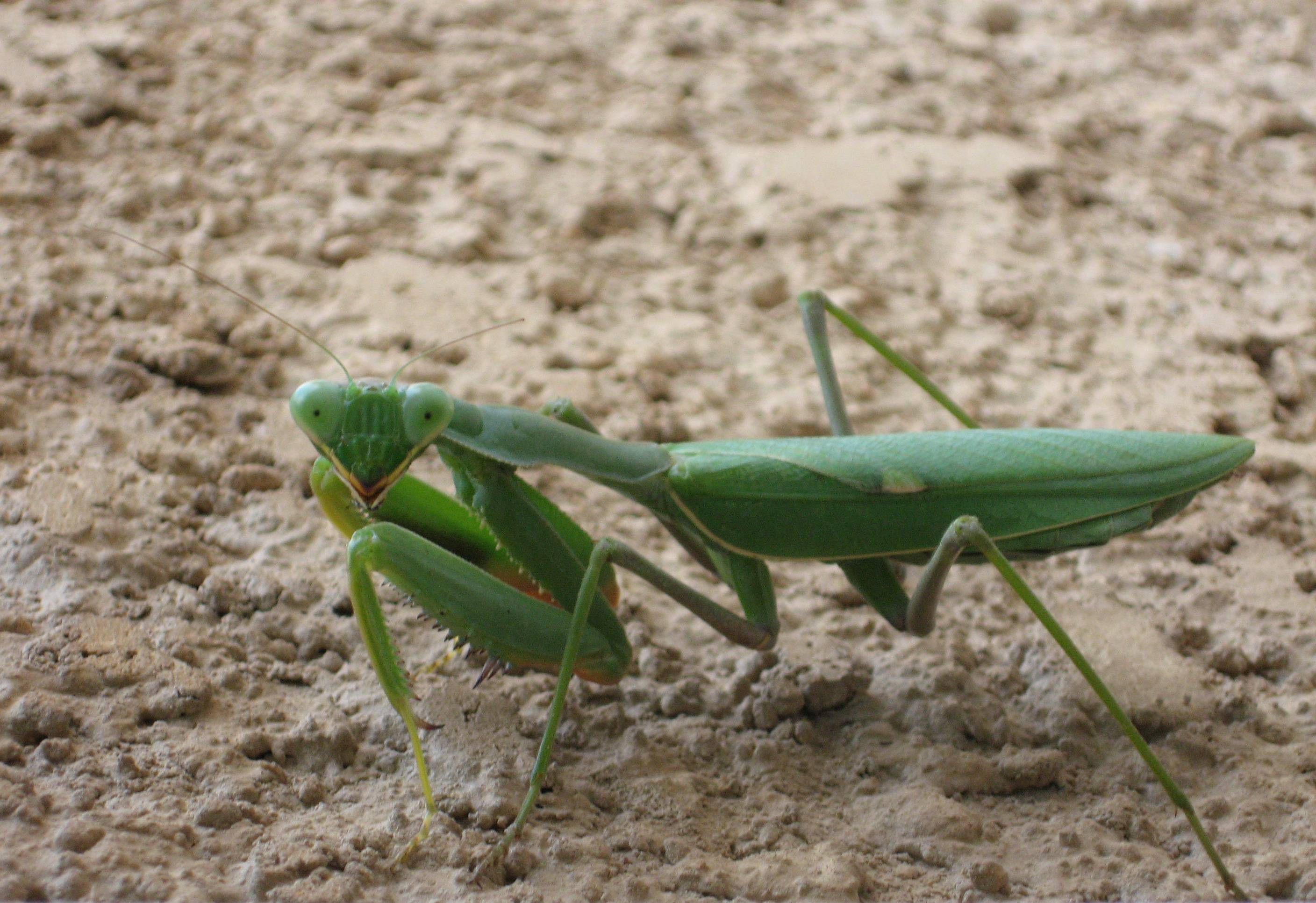
Sphodromantis viridis

Sphodromantis is a large genus of mantises concentrated in Africa. Outside their range, many share the name African mantis.

- Sphodromantis abessinica
- Sphodromantis aethiopica
- Sphodromantis annobonensis
- Sphodromantis aurea (Congo green mantis)
- Sphodromantis aureoides
- Sphodromantis baccettii
- Sphodromantis balachowskyi (African mantis)
- Sphodromantis biocellata
- Sphodromantis centralis (African mantis, Central African mantis)
- Sphodromantis citernii
- Sphodromantis congica
- Sphodromantis conspicua
- Sphodromantis elegans
- Sphodromantis elongata
- Sphodromantis fenestrata
- Sphodromantis gastrica (Common Green Mantis)
- Sphodromantis gestri
- Sphodromantis giubana
- Sphodromantis gracilicollis
- Sphodromantis gracilis
- Sphodromantis hyalina
- Sphodromantis kersteni
- Sphodromantis lagrecai
- Sphodromantis lineola (African mantis, African lined mantis)
- Sphodromantis obscura
- Sphodromantis pachinota
- Sphodromantis pardii
- Sphodromantis pavonina
- Sphodromantis pupillata
- Sphodromantis royi
- Sphodromantis rubrostigma
- Sphodromantis rudolfae
- Sphodromantis socotrana
- Sphodromantis splendida
- Sphodromantis stigmosa
- Sphodromantis tenuidentata
- Sphodromantis viridis (Giant African mantis, bush mantis)
- Sphodromantis werneri

== Genus Sphodropoda ==
- Sphodropoda lepida
- Sphodropoda quinquedens (Rainbow Mantis)
- Sphodropoda tristis (burying mantis)
- Sphodropoda viridis

== Genus Spilomantis ==
- Spilomantis nigripes
- Spilomantis occipitalis

== Genus Stagmatoptera ==
- Stagmatoptera abdominalis
- Stagmatoptera binotata
- Stagmatoptera biocellata
- Stagmatoptera cerdai
- Stagmatoptera diana
- Stagmatoptera femoralis
- Stagmatoptera hyaloptera (Argentine White-crested Mantis)
- Stagmatoptera indicator
- Stagmatoptera luna
- Stagmatoptera pia
- Stagmatoptera precaria
- Stagmatoptera reimoseri
- Stagmatoptera septentrionalis
- Stagmatoptera supplicaria (Avocado Mantis)
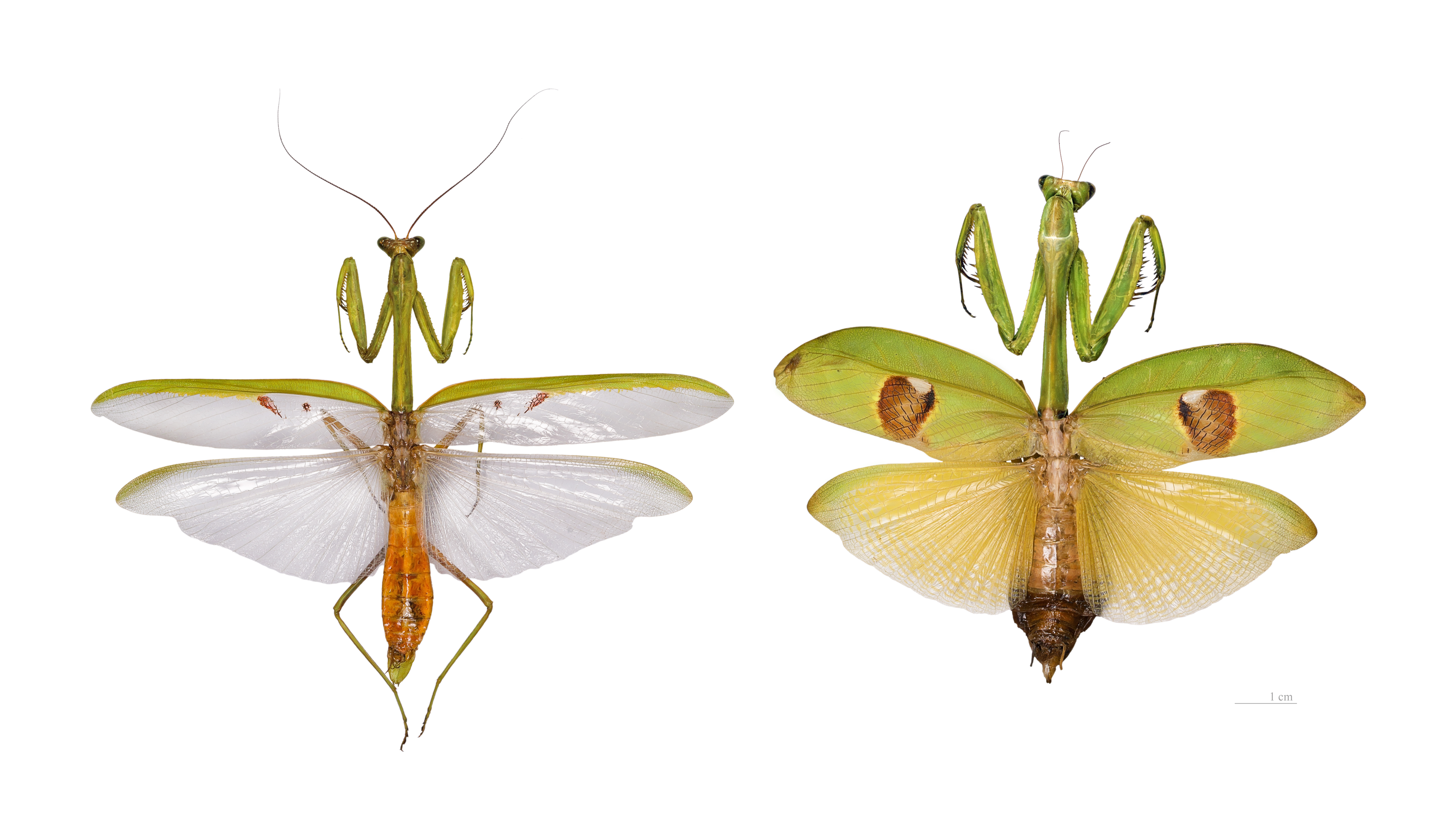
  Stagmatoptera supplicaria

== Genus Stagmomantis ==
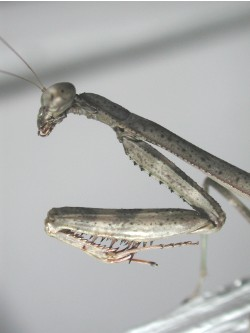
Stagmomantis carolina

The range of Stagmomantis species includes North America, Central America, and South America.

- Stagmomantis carolina (Carolina mantis)
- Stagmomantis clauseni (Sonoran Tiger Mantis)
- Stagmomantis coerulans
- Stagmomantis conspurcata
- Stagmomantis colorata
- Stagmomantis costalis
- Stagmomantis domingensis (Antillean Mantis)
- Stagmomantis floridensis (Larger Florida mantis)
- Stagmomantis fraterna
- Stagmomantis gracilipes (Arizona tan mantis)
- Stagmomantis hebardi
- Stagmomantis limbata (Bordered mantis, Arizona mantis)
- Stagmomantis marginata
- Stagmomantis maya
- Stagmomantis montana (Mountain Mantis)
- Stagmomantis nahua
- Stagmomantis pagana
- Stagmomantis parvidentata
- Stagmomantis parvula
- Stagmomantis resacae
- Stagmomantis theophila (Thorny-armed Mantis)
- Stagmomantis tolteca
- Stagmomantis venusta
- Stagmomantis vicina (Smaller Florida Mantis)
- Stagmomantis wheelerii (California mantis)

== Genus Statilia ==
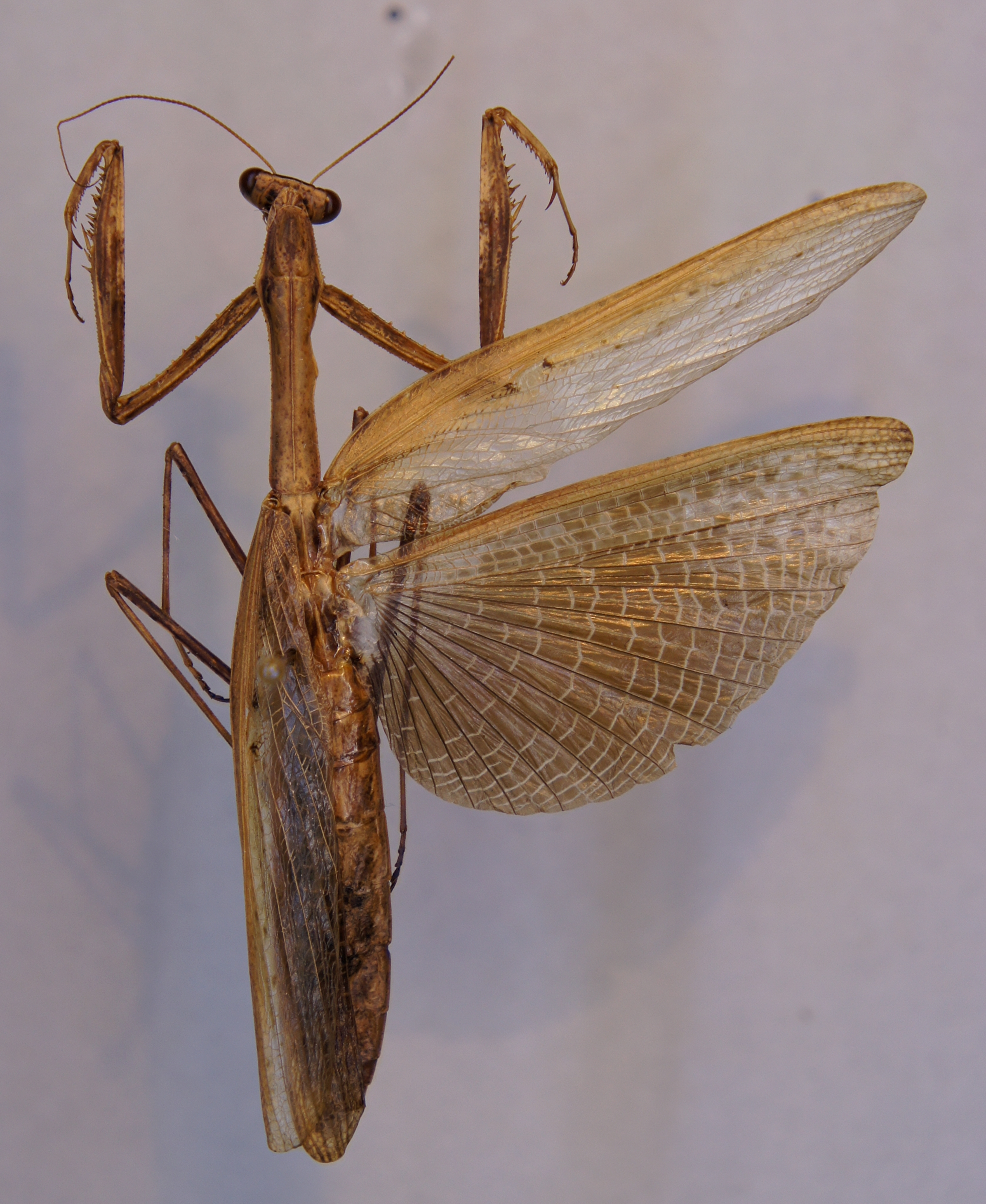
Statilia nemoralis (Saussure, 1870), male, dorsal view; det. R. Ehrmann, 2002; leg.: Malaysia, Sabah, North Borneo, District Ranau, Poring Hot Spring Lodge, May, 2002, Leg. T. Kothe

- Statilia agresta
- Statilia apicalis
- Statilia chayuensis
- Statilia flavobrunnea
- Statilia maculata (Japanese "ko-kamakiri" i.e. small mantis)
- Statilia major
- Statilia nemoralis
- Statilia nobilis
- Statilia occibivittata
- Statilia ocellata
- Statilia pallida
- Statilia spanis
- Statilia viridibrunnea

== Genus Stenomantis ==
- Stenomantis novaeguineae

== Genus Stenophylla ==
Stenophylla cornigera

- Stenophylla cornigera (Brazilian Dragon Mantis)
- Stenophylla gallardi
- Stenophylla lobivertex (Dragon Mantis)

== Genus Stenopyga ==
- Stenopyga belinga
- Stenopyga casta
- Stenopyga extera
- Stenopyga ipassa
- Stenopyga orientalis
- Stenopyga reticulata
- Stenopyga tenera
- Stenopyga usambarica
- Stenopyga ziela

== Genus Stenotoxodera ==
- Stenotoxodera pluto
- Stenotoxodera porioni

== Genus Stictomantis ==
- Stictomantis cinctipes

== Genus Tagalomantis ==
- Tagalomantis brevis
- Tagalomantis manillensis

== Genus Tamolanica ==
This is another genus with species sometimes called shield mantises.

- Tamolanica andaina
- Tamolanica atricoxis
- Tamolanica decipiens
- Tamolanica denticulata
- Tamolanica dilena
- Tamolanica katauana
- Tamolanica leopoldi
- Tamolanica pectoralis
- Tamolanica phryne
- Tamolanica tamolana (New Guinea shield mantis)

== Genus Taumantis ==
- Taumantis cephalotes
- Taumantis globiceps
- Taumantis sigiana (lime mantis)

== Genus Tauromantis ==
- Tauromantis championi

== Genus Tarachina ==
- Tarachina brevipennis
- Tarachina congica
- Tarachina constricta
- Tarachina occidentalis
- Tarachina rammei
- Tarachina raphidioides
- Tarachina schultzei
- Tarachina seriepunctata
- Tarachina transvaalensis
- Tarachina werneri
- Tarachina zernyi

== Genus Tarachodella ==
- Tarachodella monticola

== Genus Tarachodes ==
Members of this genus may be called bark mantises or ground mantises.

- Tarachodes abyssinicus
- Tarachodes aestuans
- Tarachodes afzelii (Tanzanian ground mantis)
- Tarachodes alluaudi
- Tarachodes arabicus
- Tarachodes basinotatus
- Tarachodes beieri
- Tarachodes betakarschi
- Tarachodes bicornis (two-horned mantis)
- Tarachodes bispinosus
- Tarachodes brevipennis
- Tarachodes chopardi
- Tarachodes circulifer
- Tarachodes circuliferoides
- Tarachodes davidi
- Tarachodes dissimulator
- Tarachodes dives
- Tarachodes feae
- Tarachodes fraterculus
- Tarachodes fuscipennis
- Tarachodes gerstaeckeri
- Tarachodes gibber
- Tarachodes gigas
- Tarachodes gilvus
- Tarachodes griseus
- Tarachodes haedus
- Tarachodes insidiator
- Tarachodes karschi
- Tarachodes lucubrans
- Tarachodes maculisternum
- Tarachodes maurus
- Tarachodes minor
- Tarachodes modesta
- Tarachodes monstrosus
- Tarachodes namibiensis
- Tarachodes natalensis
- Tarachodes nubifer
- Tarachodes nyassanus
- Tarachodes obscuripennis
- Tarachodes obtusiceps
- Tarachodes okahandyanus
- Tarachodes oxynotus
- Tarachodes perloides
- Tarachodes pilosipes
- Tarachodes pujoli
- Tarachodes rhodesicus
- Tarachodes robustus
- Tarachodes rotundiceps
- Tarachodes sanctus (Holy Bark Mantid)
- Tarachodes saussurei
- Tarachodes schulthessi
- Tarachodes severini
- Tarachodes similis
- Tarachodes sjostedti
- Tarachodes smithi
- Tarachodes taboranus
- Tarachodes tananus
- Tarachodes taramassi
- Tarachodes ugandensis
- Tarachodes usambaricus
- Tarachodes vitreus
- Tarachodes werneri

== Genus Tarachodula ==
- Tarachodula ornata
- Tarachodula pantherina (Panther Mantis)

== Genus Tarachomantis ==
- Tarachomantis alaotrana
- Tarachomantis analamazoatra
- Tarachomantis betanimena
- Tarachomantis betsilea
- Tarachomantis caldwelli
- Tarachomantis confusa
- Tarachomantis hova
- Tarachomantis macula
- Tarachomantis marojeziensis
- Tarachomantis rubiginosa
- Tarachomantis sakalava
- Tarachomantis sogai
- Tarachomantis tsaratanana

== Genus Teddia ==
- Teddia dioscoris

== Genus Telomantis ==
- Telomantis lamperti
- Telomantis robusta

== Genus Tenodera ==
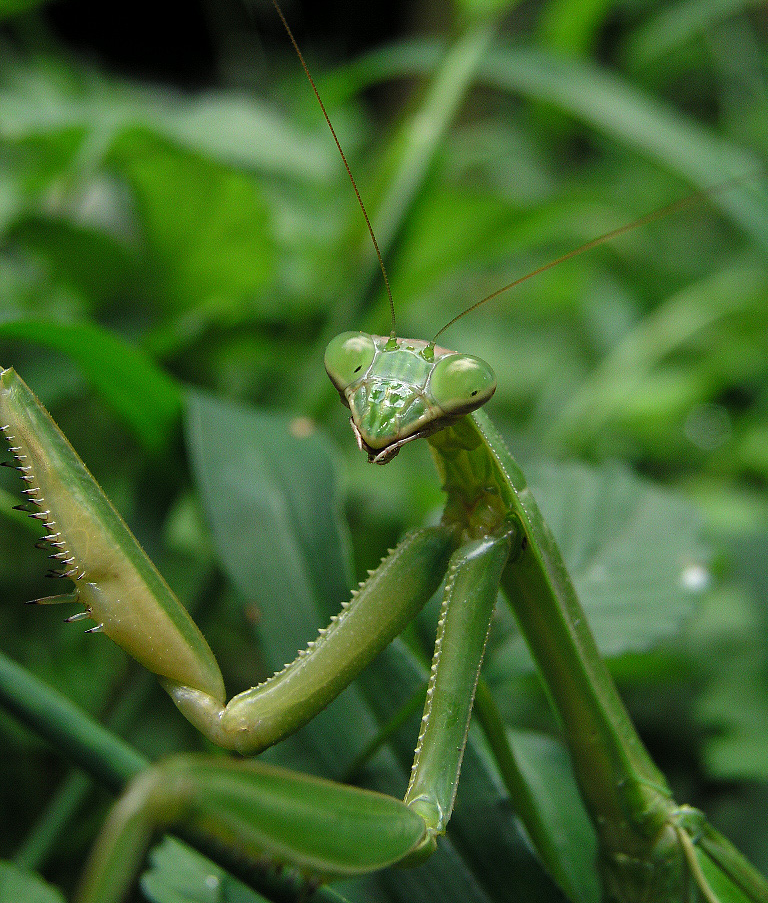
Adult female Tenodera sinensis

Species of the genus Tenodera are found in Asia, Africa, Australia and North America.

- Tenodera acuticauda
- Tenodera angustipennis (Narrow-winged Mantis)
- Tenodera aridifolia
- Tenodera australasiae (Purple-winged Mantis)
- Tenodera caudafissilis
- Tenodera chloreudeta
- Tenodera costalis
- Tenodera fasciata
- Tenodera intermedia
- Tenodera iringana
- Tenodera parasinensis
- Tenodera philippina
- Tenodera rungsi
- Tenodera sinensis (Chinese Mantis)
- Tenodera stotzneri
- Tenodera superstitiosa (Stick Mantis)

== Genus Tenospilota ==
- Tenospilota nova

== Genus Theopompa ==
These species are sometimes known as the Asian bark mantises.

- Theopompa borneana
- Theopompa burmeisteri
- Theopompa ophthalmica
- Theopompa servillei
- Theopompa tosta

== Genus Theopompella ==
- Theopompella aurivillii
- Theopompella chopardi
- Theopompella congica
- Theopompella elegans
- Theopompella fusca
- Theopompella heterochroa
- Theopompella orientalis
- Theopompella pallida
- Theopompella westwoodi

== Genus Theopropus ==
Boxer mantis and flower mantis, and Banded Flower Mantis are among the common names used for members of this genus.

- Theopropus borneensis
- Theopropus cattulus
- Theopropus elegans (Banded flower mantis, Asian boxer mantis)
- Theopropus rubrobrunneus

== Genus Thespis ==
- Thespis bicolor
- Thespis dissimilis
- Thespis exposita
- Thespis major
- Thespis media
- Thespis metae
- Thespis parva

== Genus Thesprotia ==
This genus is sometimes called American grass mantises.

Thesprotia infumata

- Thesprotia brasiliensis
- Thesprotia brevis
- Thesprotia caribea
- Thesprotia filum
- Thesprotia fuscipennis
- Thesprotia gigas
- Thesprotia graminis (American grass mantis)
- Thesprotia infumata
- Thesprotia insolita
- Thesprotia macilenta
- Thesprotia maculata
- Thesprotia pellucida
- Thesprotia simplex
- Thesprotia subhyalina

== Genus Thesprotiella ==
Thesprotiella peruana

Thesprotiella graminis

- Thesprotiella bicorniculata
- Thesprotiella festae
- Thesprotiella fronticornis
- Thesprotiella peruana
- Thesprotiella similis

== Genus Thrinaconyx ==
Thrinaconyx fumosus

- Thrinaconyx fumosus
- Thrinaconyx kirschianus
- Thrinaconyx sialidea

== Genus Tisma ==
- Tisma acutipennis
- Tisma chopardi
- Tisma freyi
- Tisma grandidieri
- Tisma pauliani
- Tisma peyrierasi

== Genus Tismomorpha ==
- Tismomorpha cherlonneixi
- Tismomorpha inexpectata
- Tismomorpha reinhardi
- Tismomorpha vitripennis

== Genus Titanodula ==
- Titanodula attenboroughi
- Titanodula formosana
- Titanodula fruhstorferi
- Titanodula grandis

== Genus Tithrone ==
- Tithrone laeta
- Tithrone latipennis
- Tithrone roseipennis
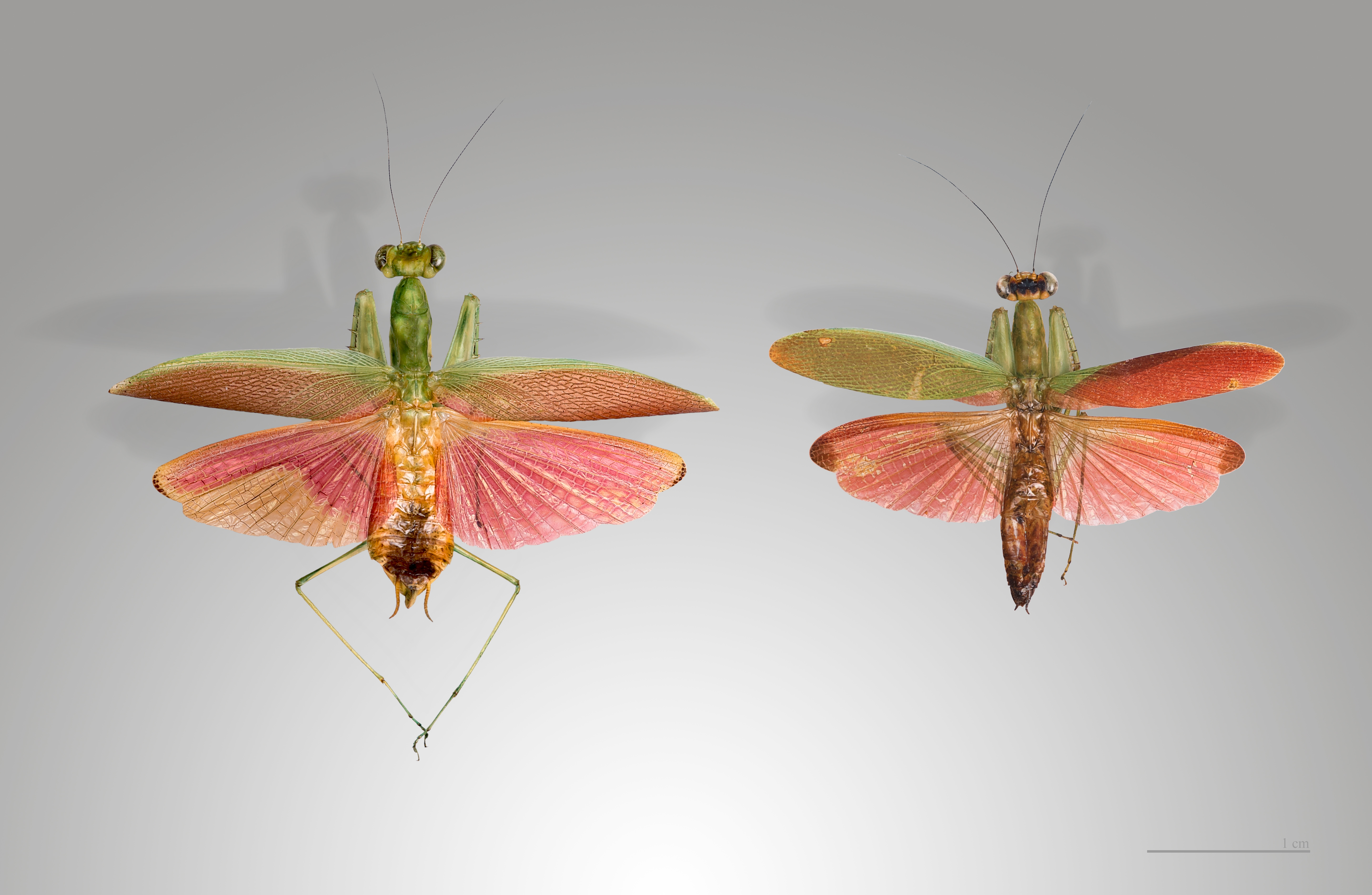
  Tithrone roseipennis

== Genus Toxodanuria ==
- Toxodanuria orientalis
- Toxodanuria parvula

== Genus Toxodera ==
- Toxodera beieri (Dragon Mantis)
- Toxodera denticulata
- Toxodera fimbriata (Feather Mantis)
- Toxodera hauseri
- Toxodera integrifolia (Flower Dragon Mantis)
- Toxodera maculata
- Toxodera maxima
- Toxodera pfanneri

== Genus Toxoderella ==
- Toxoderella fortnumi

== Genus Toxoderopsis ==
- Toxoderopsis spinigera
- Toxoderopsis taurus

== Genus Toxomantis ==
- Toxomantis sinensis
- Toxomantis westwoodi

== Genus Trachymantis ==
- Trachymantis dentifrons
- Trachymantis obesa

== Genus Tricondylomimus ==
- Tricondylomimus coomani
- Tricondylomimus intermedius
- Tricondylomimus mirabilis

== Genus Tropidomantis ==
- Tropidomantis gressitti
- Tropidomantis kawaharai
- Tropidomantis tenera

== Genus Tuberculepsus ==
- Tuberculepsus ambrensis
- Tuberculepsus analabensis
- Tuberculepsus andriai
- Tuberculepsus beieri
- Tuberculepsus masoalensis
- Tuberculepsus nigricoxa
- Tuberculepsus orangea
- Tuberculepsus tuberculatus

== Genus Tylomantis ==
- Tylomantis armillata
- Tylomantis fuliginosa

== Genus Vates ==
- Vates amazonica
- Vates biplagiata
- Vates boliviana
- Vates chopardi
- Vates festae
- Vates foliata
- Vates lobata
- Vates luxuriosa
- Vates pectinata
- Vates pectinicornis
- Vates peruviana
- Vates serraticornis
- Vates weyrauchi

== Genus Velox ==
- Velox wielandi

== Genus Vespamantoida ==
- Vespamantoida toulgoeti
- Vespamantoida wherleyi

== Genus †Vitimiphotina ==
- †Vitimiphotina corrugata

== Genus Werneriana ==
- Werneriana latipennis

== Genus Xystropeltis ==
- Xystropeltis lankesteri
- Xystropeltis meridionalis
- Xystropeltis quadrilobata

== Genus Yersinia ==
- Yersinia mexicana (Mexican Jumping Mantis, Mexican Ground Mantis)

== Genus Yersiniops ==
Members of this genus are commonly called ground mantises. Genus Pseudoyersinia is similar.

- Yersiniops newboldi
- Yersiniops solitaria (horned ground mantis)
- Yersiniops sophronica (Yersin's ground mantis)

== Genus Zoolea ==
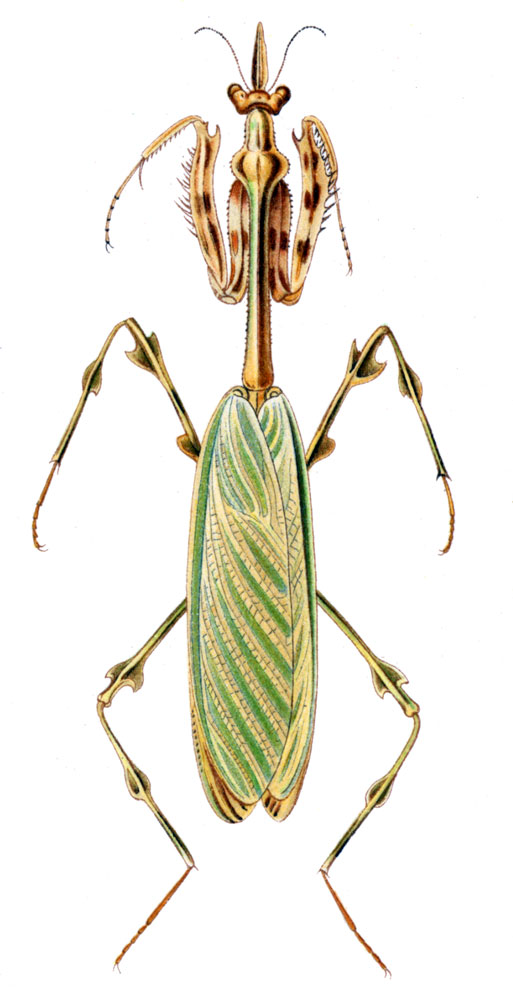
Zoolea lobipes

All members of this genus go by the common name unicorn mantis.

- Zoolea descampsi
- Zoolea lobipes
- Zoolea major
- Zoolea minor
- Zoolea orba

== Genus Zopheromantis ==
- Zopheromantis loripes

== Genus Zouza ==
- Zouza radiosa

== Families ==
According to most recent taxonomy, all genera of mantis now belong to one of the following families:

- Extinct taxa
  - †Un-named mantis family
  - †Baissomantidae
  - †Cretomantidae
  - †Santanmantidae Grimaldi, 2003
- Extant taxa (suborder Eumantodea)
  - Infraorder Schizomantodea
    - Subinfraordinal group Artimantodea
      - Superfamily group Amerimantodea
        - Superfamily Acanthopoidea
          - Family Acanthopidae
          - Family Angelidae
          - Family Coptopterygidae
          - Family Liturgusidae
          - Family Photinaidae
        - Superfamily Thespoidea
          - Family Thespidae
      - Superfamily group Cernomantodea
        - Superfamily Chroicopteroidea
          - Family Chroicopteridae
        - Superfamily Epaphroditoidea
          - Family Epaphroditidae
          - Family Majangidae
        - Superfamily Eremiaphiloidea
          - Family Amelidae
          - Family Eremiaphilidae
          - Family Rivetinidae
          - Family Toxoderidae
        - Superfamily Galinthiadoidea
          - Family Galinthiadidae
        - Superfamily Gonypetoidea
          - Family Gonypetidae
        - Superfamily Haanioidea
          - Family Haaniidae
        - Superfamily Hoplocoryphoidea
          - Family Hoplocoryphidae
        - Superfamily Hymenopooidea
          - Family Empusidae
          - Family Hymenopodidae
        - Superfamily Mantoidea
          - Family Dactylopterygidae
          - Family Deroplatyidae
          - Family Mantidae
        - Superfamily Miomantoidea
          - Family Miomantidae
        - Superfamily Nanomantoidea
          - Family Amorphoscelidae
          - Family Leptomantellidae
          - Family Nanomantidae
    - Superfamily Metallyticoidea
      - Family Metallyticidae
  - Infraorder Spinomantodea
    - Superfamily Mantoidoidea
      - Family Mantoididae
  - Superfamily Chaeteessoidea
    - Family Chaeteessidae

== See also ==
- Bark mantis
- Boxer mantis
- Dead leaf mantis
- Flower mantis
- Grass mantis
- Ground mantis
- Leaf mantis
- Shield mantis
- Stick mantis
