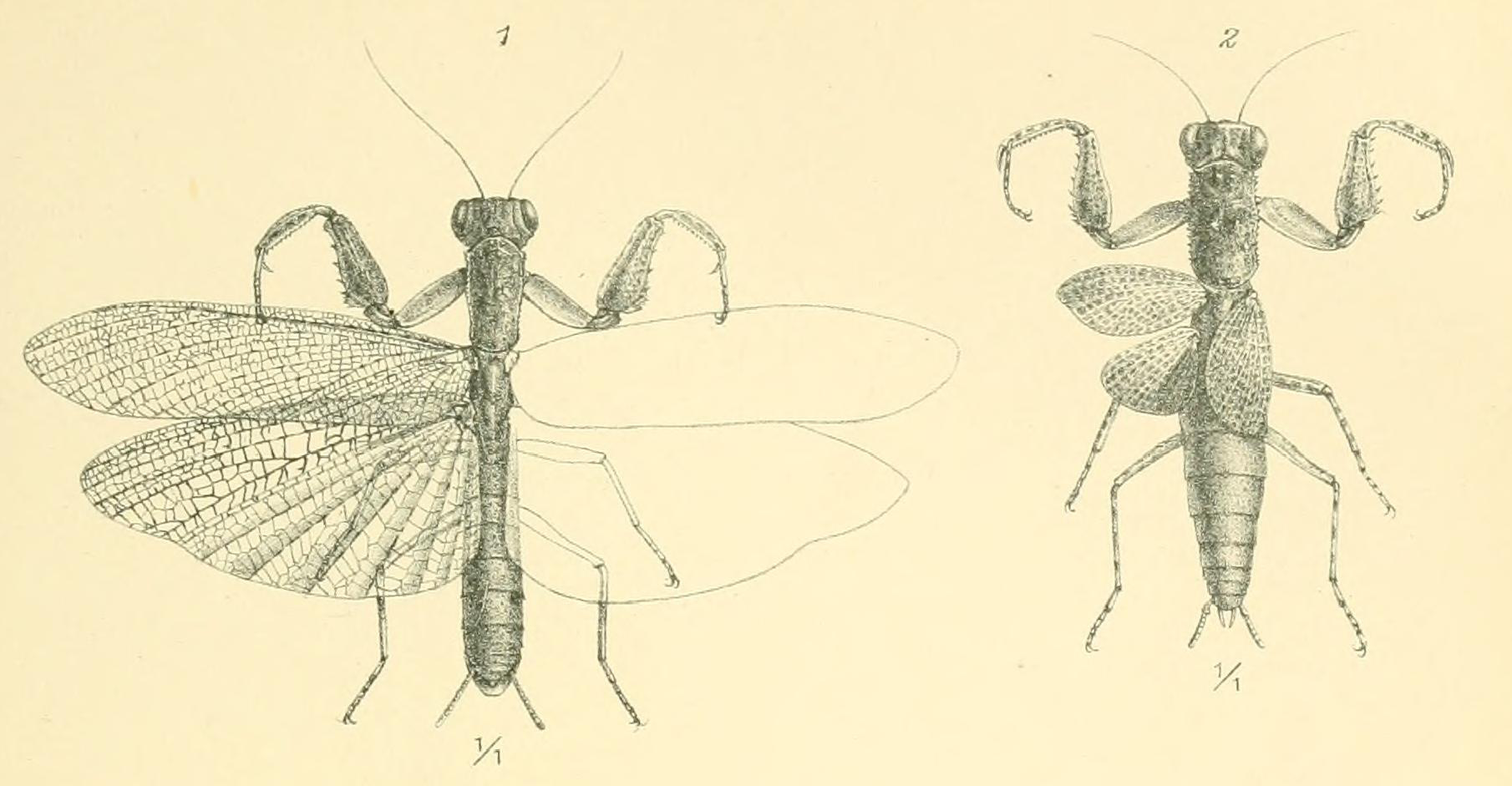
- Male and female

Scientific classification
- Domain: Eukaryota
- Kingdom: Animalia
- Phylum: Arthropoda
- Class: Insecta
- Order: Mantodea
- Family: Eremiaphilidae
- Genus: Tarachodes
- Species: T. perloides

Binomial name
- Tarachodes perloides Burmeister, 1838

Synonyms
- Tarachodes nympha Stoll, 1813

= Tarachodes perloides =

Species of praying mantis

Tarachodes perloides is a species of praying mantis in the family Eremiaphilidae.

== See also ==
- List of mantis genera and species
