= Pyrgomantis ornatipes =

Scientific classification
- Kingdom: Animalia
- Phylum: Arthropoda
- Clade: Pancrustacea
- Class: Insecta
- Order: Mantodea
- Family: Eremiaphilidae
- Genus: Pyrgomantis
- Species: P. ornatipes

Binomial name
- Pyrgomantis ornatipes Bolivar, 1922

Species of praying mantis

Pyrgomantis ornatipes is a species of praying mantis found in Ethiopia.

== See also ==
- List of mantis genera and species
