= Dysaules himalayanus =

Scientific classification
- Domain: Eukaryota
- Kingdom: Animalia
- Phylum: Arthropoda
- Class: Insecta
- Order: Mantodea
- Family: Eremiaphilidae
- Genus: Dysaules
- Species: D. himalayanus

Binomial name
- Dysaules himalayanus Wood-Mason, 1889

Species of praying mantis

Dysaules himalayanus is a species of praying mantis in the genus Dysaules.

== See also ==
- List of mantis genera and species
