= T. bicornis =

T. bicornis may refer to:

- Tarachodes bicornis, a praying mantis species
- Trapa bicornis, a plant species
