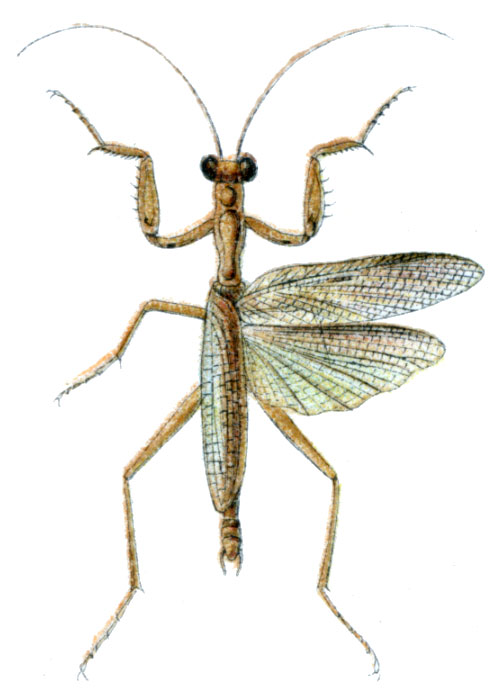

Scientific classification
- Kingdom: Animalia
- Phylum: Arthropoda
- Clade: Pancrustacea
- Class: Insecta
- Order: Mantodea
- Family: Eremiaphilidae
- Genus: Paralygdamia
- Species: P. madagascariensis

Binomial name
- Paralygdamia madagascariensis (Serville, 1839)

Synonyms
- Nesogalepsus madagascariensis Serville, 1839

= Paralygdamia madagascariensis =

Species of praying mantis

Paralygdamia madagascariensis is a species of praying mantis native to Madagascar.

== See also ==
- List of mantis genera and species
