= Pyrgomantis wellmanni =

Scientific classification
- Kingdom: Animalia
- Phylum: Arthropoda
- Clade: Pancrustacea
- Class: Insecta
- Order: Mantodea
- Family: Eremiaphilidae
- Genus: Pyrgomantis
- Species: P. wellmanni

Binomial name
- Pyrgomantis wellmanni Rehn, 1912

Species of praying mantis

Pyrgomantis wellmanni is a species of praying mantis found in Angola. They have a green body with white & green wings.

== See also ==
- List of mantis genera and species
