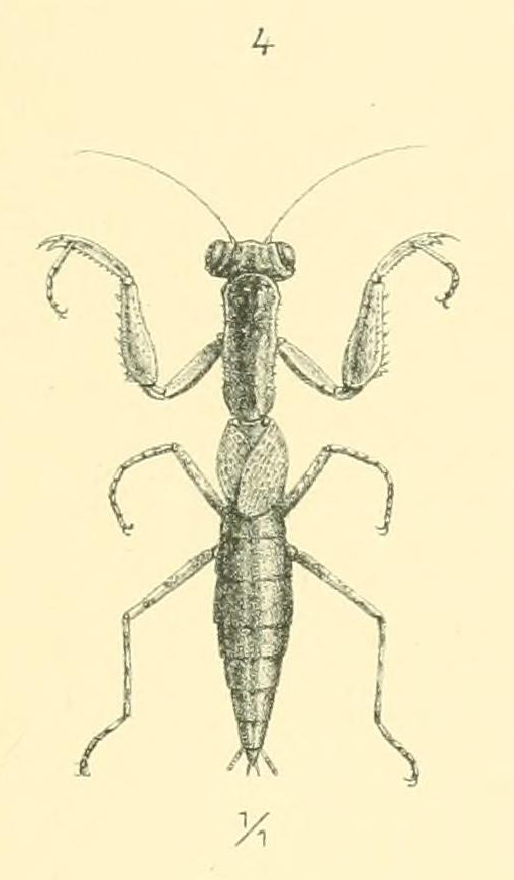
- Female

Scientific classification
- Domain: Eukaryota
- Kingdom: Animalia
- Phylum: Arthropoda
- Class: Insecta
- Order: Mantodea
- Family: Eremiaphilidae
- Genus: Tarachodes
- Species: T. sjostedti

Binomial name
- Tarachodes sjostedti Werner, 1907

Synonyms
- Tarachodes congolensis Werner, 1915; Tarachodes pilosa Sjostedt, 1930

= Tarachodes sjostedti =

Species of praying mantis

Tarachodes sjostedti is a species of praying mantis in the family Eremiaphilidae.

== See also ==
- List of mantis genera and species
