= Oxyophthalmellus rehni =

Scientific classification
- Kingdom: Animalia
- Phylum: Arthropoda
- Clade: Pancrustacea
- Class: Insecta
- Order: Mantodea
- Family: Eremiaphilidae
- Genus: Oxyophthalmellus
- Species: O. rehni

Binomial name
- Oxyophthalmellus rehni La Greca, 1952

Species of praying mantis

Oxyophthalmellus rehni is a species of praying mantis found in Kenya and Somalia.

== See also ==
- List of mantis genera and species
