= Dysaules longicollis =

Scientific classification
- Kingdom: Animalia
- Phylum: Arthropoda
- Clade: Pancrustacea
- Class: Insecta
- Order: Mantodea
- Family: Eremiaphilidae
- Genus: Dysaules
- Species: D. longicollis

Binomial name
- Dysaules longicollis Stal, 1877

Synonyms
- Dysaules hampsoni Wood-Mason, 1889

Species of praying mantis

Dysaules longicollis is a species of praying mantis in the family Eremiaphilidae.

== See also ==
- List of mantis genera and species
