= Dysaules uvana =

Scientific classification
- Kingdom: Animalia
- Phylum: Arthropoda
- Class: Insecta
- Order: Mantodea
- Family: Eremiaphilidae
- Genus: Dysaules
- Species: D. uvana

Binomial name
- Dysaules uvana Henry, 1932

Species of praying mantis

Dysaules uvana is a species of praying mantis in the genus Dysaules.

== See also ==
- List of mantis genera and species
