= Pyrgomantis bisignata =

Scientific classification
- Kingdom: Animalia
- Phylum: Arthropoda
- Clade: Pancrustacea
- Class: Insecta
- Order: Mantodea
- Family: Eremiaphilidae
- Genus: Pyrgomantis
- Species: P. bisignata

Binomial name
- Pyrgomantis bisignata Beier, 1957

Species of praying mantis

Pyrgomantis bisignata, common name Jones' mantis is a species of praying mantis found in the Congo River region.

== See also ==
- List of mantis genera and species
