= Oxyophthalmellus somalicus =

Scientific classification
- Kingdom: Animalia
- Phylum: Arthropoda
- Clade: Pancrustacea
- Class: Insecta
- Order: Mantodea
- Family: Eremiaphilidae
- Genus: Oxyophthalmellus
- Species: O. somalicus

Binomial name
- Oxyophthalmellus somalicus Rehn, 1911

Species of praying mantis

Oxyophthalmellus somalicus is a species of praying mantis found in Ethiopia, Kenya, Somalia, and Tanzania.

== See also ==
- List of mantis genera and species
