= Pyrgomantis mabuia =

Scientific classification
- Kingdom: Animalia
- Phylum: Arthropoda
- Clade: Pancrustacea
- Class: Insecta
- Order: Mantodea
- Family: Eremiaphilidae
- Genus: Pyrgomantis
- Species: P. mabuia

Binomial name
- Pyrgomantis mabuia Werner, 1907

Species of praying mantis

Pyrgomantis mabuia is a species of praying mantis found in Uganda.

== See also ==
- List of mantis genera and species
