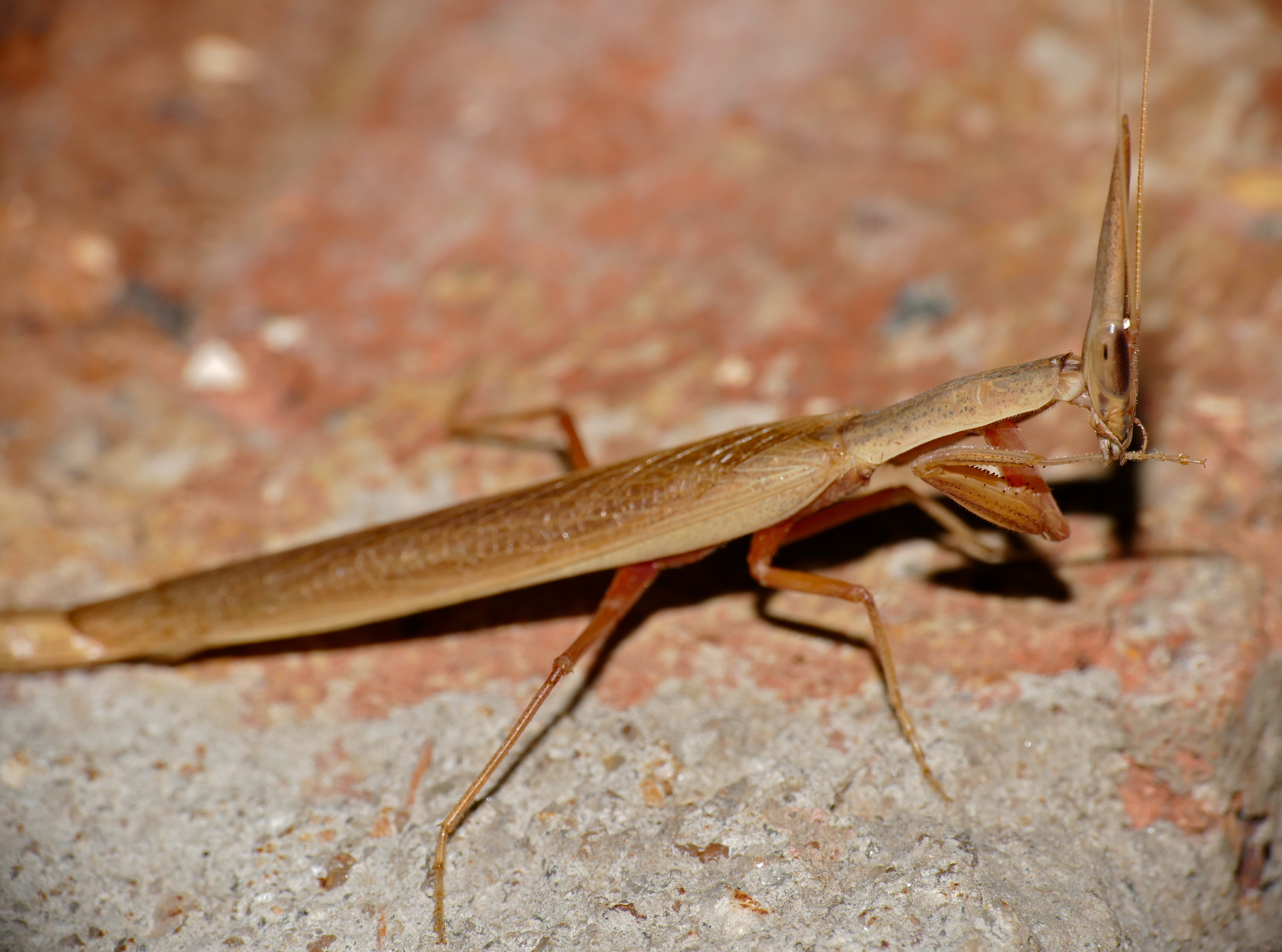

Scientific classification
- Kingdom: Animalia
- Phylum: Arthropoda
- Clade: Pancrustacea
- Class: Insecta
- Order: Mantodea
- Family: Eremiaphilidae
- Genus: Pyrgomantis
- Species: P. rhodesica

Binomial name
- Pyrgomantis rhodesica Giglio-Tos, 1917

= Pyrgomantis rhodesica =

Species of praying mantis

Pyrgomantis rhodesica is a species of praying mantis found in Botswana, Namibia, Transvaal, Zambia, and Zimbabwe.

== See also ==
- List of mantis genera and species
