= Pyrgomantis pallida =

Scientific classification
- Kingdom: Animalia
- Phylum: Arthropoda
- Clade: Pancrustacea
- Class: Insecta
- Order: Mantodea
- Family: Eremiaphilidae
- Genus: Pyrgomantis
- Species: P. pallida

Binomial name
- Pyrgomantis pallida Giglio-Tos, 1917

Species of praying mantis

Pyrgomantis pallida is a species of praying mantis found in Burkina Faso, Ghana, Guinea, Cameroon, Congo, Nigeria, and Togo.

== See also ==
- List of mantis genera and species
