= Tarachodes schulthessi =

Scientific classification
- Domain: Eukaryota
- Kingdom: Animalia
- Phylum: Arthropoda
- Class: Insecta
- Order: Mantodea
- Family: Eremiaphilidae
- Genus: Tarachodes
- Species: T. schulthessi

Binomial name
- Tarachodes schulthessi Rehn, 1901

Species of praying mantis

Tarachodes schulthessi is a species of praying mantis in the family Eremiaphilidae.

== See also ==
- List of mantis genera and species
