= T. sanctus =

T. sanctus may refer to:

- Todiramphus sanctus, the sacred kingfisher
- Tarachodes sanctus, a species of praying mantis
