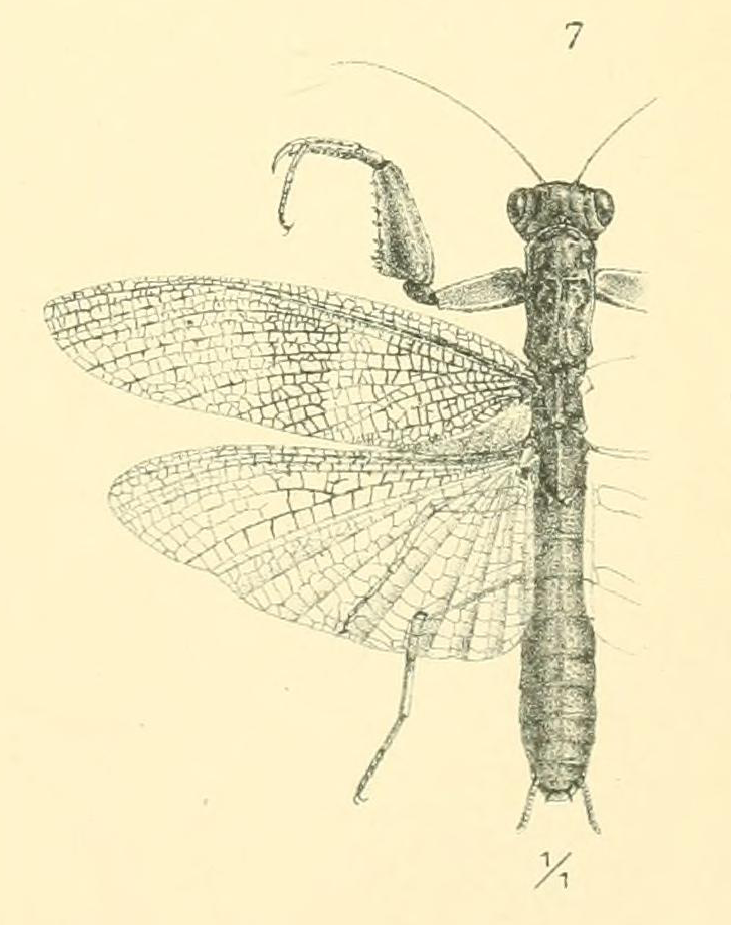
- Male

Scientific classification
- Kingdom: Animalia
- Phylum: Arthropoda
- Clade: Pancrustacea
- Class: Insecta
- Order: Mantodea
- Family: Eremiaphilidae
- Genus: Tarachodes
- Species: T. dissimulator

Binomial name
- Tarachodes dissimulator Wood-Mason, 1882

= Tarachodes dissimulator =

Species of praying mantis

Tarachodes dissimulator is a species of praying mantis in the family Eremiaphilidae.

== See also ==
- List of mantis genera and species
