= Pyrgomantis congica =

Scientific classification
- Kingdom: Animalia
- Phylum: Arthropoda
- Clade: Pancrustacea
- Class: Insecta
- Order: Mantodea
- Family: Eremiaphilidae
- Genus: Pyrgomantis
- Species: P. congica

Binomial name
- Pyrgomantis congica Giglio-Tos, 1917

Species of praying mantis

Pyrgomantis congica is a species of praying mantis found in Angola, Tanzania, and the Congo River region.

== See also ==
- List of mantis genera and species
