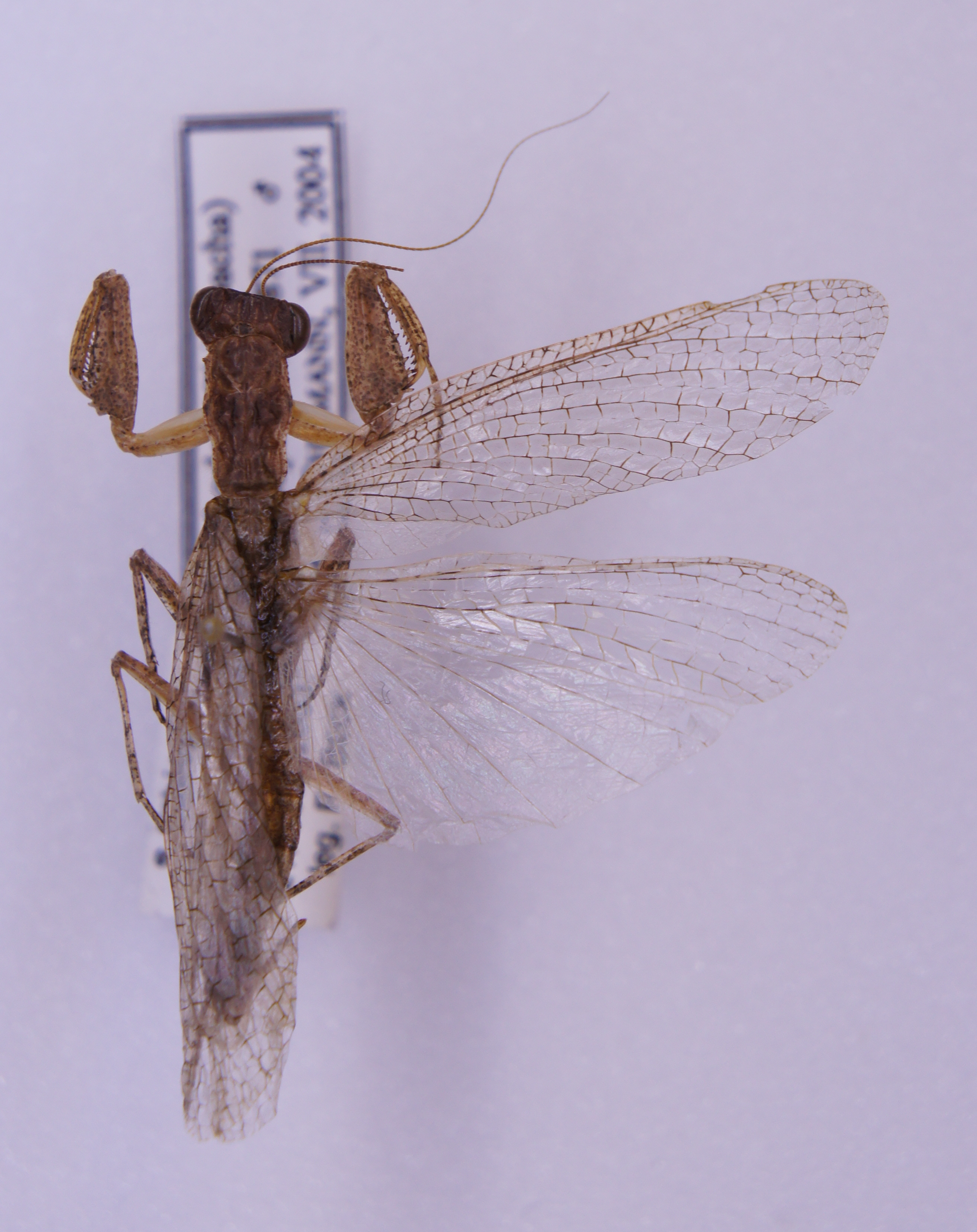

Scientific classification
- Kingdom: Animalia
- Phylum: Arthropoda
- Clade: Pancrustacea
- Class: Insecta
- Order: Mantodea
- Family: Eremiaphilidae
- Genus: Tarachodes
- Species: T. obtusiceps

Binomial name
- Tarachodes obtusiceps Stål, 1871

= Tarachodes obtusiceps =

Species of praying mantis

Tarachodes obtusiceps is a species of praying mantis in the family Eremiaphilidae described by Carl Stål in 1871.

== See also ==
- List of mantis genera and species
