= Dysaules brevipennis =

Scientific classification
- Domain: Eukaryota
- Kingdom: Animalia
- Phylum: Arthropoda
- Class: Insecta
- Order: Mantodea
- Family: Eremiaphilidae
- Genus: Dysaules
- Species: D. brevipennis

Binomial name
- Dysaules brevipennis Wood-Mason, 1882

Species of praying mantis

Dysaules brevipennis is a species of praying mantis in the genus Dysaules.

== See also ==
- List of mantis genera and species
