= Tarachodes oxynotus =

Scientific classification
- Kingdom: Animalia
- Phylum: Arthropoda
- Class: Insecta
- Order: Mantodea
- Family: Eremiaphilidae
- Genus: Tarachodes
- Species: T. oxynotus

Binomial name
- Tarachodes oxynotus La Greca, 1952

Species of praying mantis

Tarachodes oxynotus is a species of praying mantis in the family Eremiaphilidae., a family characterized by their adaptations to arid environments. The species is part of the genus Tarachodes, which contains mantises known for their cryptic appearance and predatory behavior.

== See also ==
- List of mantis genera and species
