= Pyrgomantis nasuta =

Scientific classification
- Kingdom: Animalia
- Phylum: Arthropoda
- Clade: Pancrustacea
- Class: Insecta
- Order: Mantodea
- Family: Eremiaphilidae
- Genus: Pyrgomantis
- Species: P. nasuta

Binomial name
- Pyrgomantis nasuta Thunberg, 1784

Synonyms
- Mantis nasuta (Thunberg 1784); Mantis capensis (Gmelin 1790)

Species of praying mantis

Pyrgomantis nasuta is a species of praying mantis that belongs to the family Eremiaphilidae. It is found in Africa in regions such as Angola, Cape Province, Cameroon, Kenya, Natal, Namibia, Somalia, and Tanzania.

== See also ==
- List of mantis genera and species
