= Pyrgomantis simillima =

Scientific classification
- Kingdom: Animalia
- Phylum: Arthropoda
- Clade: Pancrustacea
- Class: Insecta
- Order: Mantodea
- Family: Eremiaphilidae
- Genus: Pyrgomantis
- Species: P. simillima

Binomial name
- Pyrgomantis simillima Beier, 1954

Species of praying mantis

Pyrgomantis simillima is a species of praying mantis found in Tanzania, Transvaal Province, and Zimbabwe. It was originally identified as two separate species: Pyrgomantis curta (Beier, 1954) and Pyrgomantis simillima (also Beier, 1954).

== See also ==
- List of mantis genera and species
