= Pyrgomantis jonesi =

Scientific classification
- Kingdom: Animalia
- Phylum: Arthropoda
- Clade: Pancrustacea
- Class: Insecta
- Order: Mantodea
- Family: Eremiaphilidae
- Genus: Pyrgomantis
- Species: P. jonesi

Binomial name
- Pyrgomantis jonesi Kirby, 1904

Synonyms
- Pyrgomantis nigerica Giglio-Tos, 1917; Pyrgomantis occidentalis Giglio-Tos, 1917; Pyrgomantis septentrionalis Werner, 1907

Species of praying mantis

Pyrgomantis jonesi, common name Jones' mantis, is a species of praying mantis found in Burkina Faso, Ghana, Cameroon, Nigeria, Niger, and Senegal.

== See also ==
- List of mantis genera and species
