= Pyrgomantis runifera =

Scientific classification
- Kingdom: Animalia
- Phylum: Arthropoda
- Clade: Pancrustacea
- Class: Insecta
- Order: Mantodea
- Family: Eremiaphilidae
- Genus: Pyrgomantis
- Species: P. runifera

Binomial name
- Pyrgomantis runifera Beier, 1957

Species of praying mantis

Pyrgomantis runifera is a species of praying mantis found in the Congo River area.

== See also ==
- List of mantis genera and species
