= Tarachodula pantherina =

Scientific classification
- Kingdom: Animalia
- Phylum: Arthropoda
- Clade: Pancrustacea
- Class: Insecta
- Order: Mantodea
- Family: Eremiaphilidae
- Genus: Tarachodula
- Species: T. pantherina

Binomial name
- Tarachodula pantherina Gerstaecker, 1869

Species of mantis

Tarachodula pantherina, also known as the Panther Mantis, is a species of mantis from the family Eremiaphilidae native to Kenya.

== See also ==
- List of mantis genera and species
