= Heteronutarsus zolotarevskyi =

Scientific classification
- Kingdom: Animalia
- Phylum: Arthropoda
- Clade: Pancrustacea
- Class: Insecta
- Order: Mantodea
- Family: Eremiaphilidae
- Genus: Heteronutarsus
- Species: H. zolotarevskyi

Binomial name
- Heteronutarsus zolotarevskyi Chopard, 1940

Species of praying mantis

Heteronutarsus zolotarevskyi, common name Anubis mantis, is a species of praying mantis found in Chad.

== See also ==
- List of mantis genera and species
