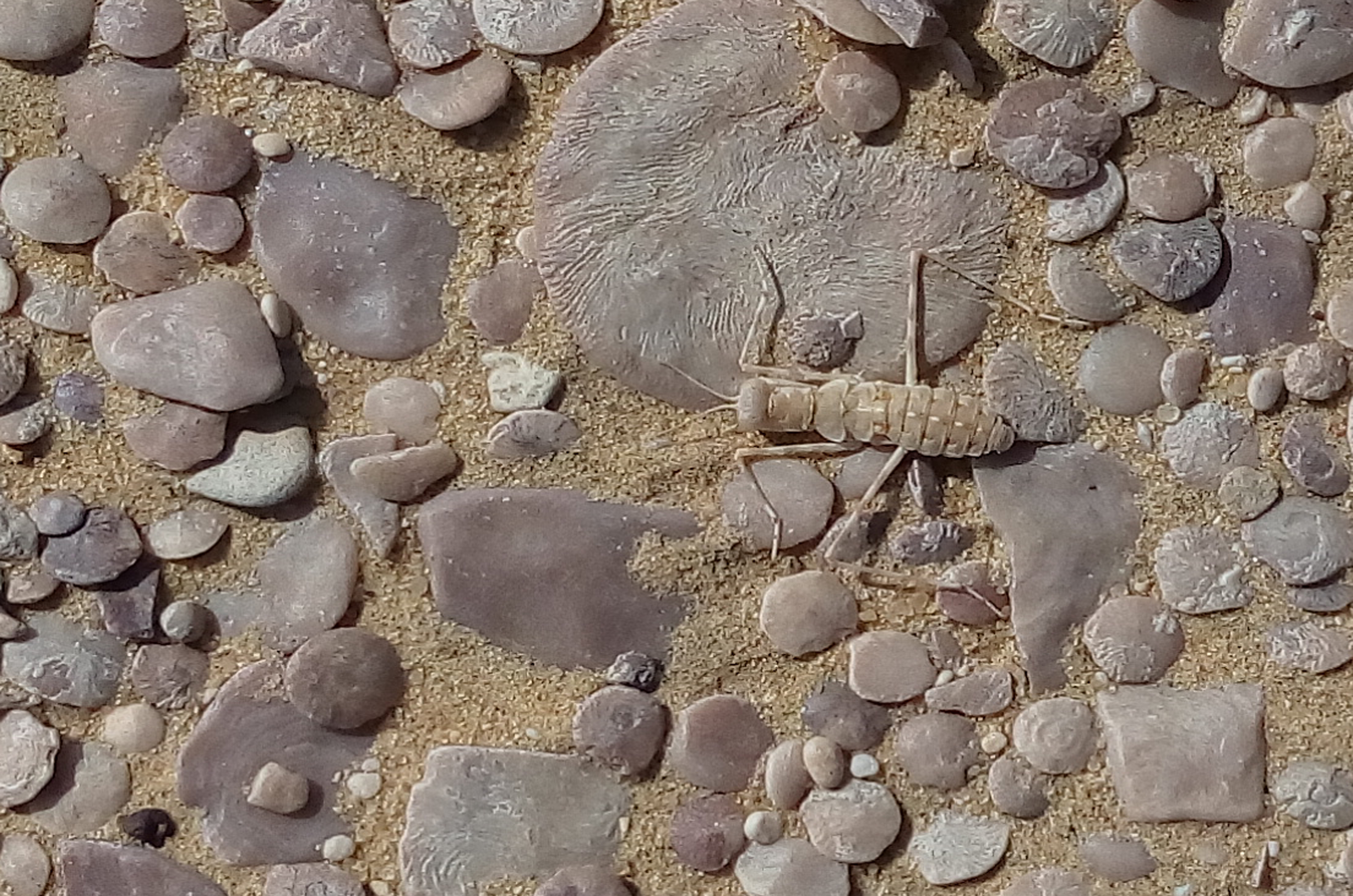
- Heteronutarsus at Wadi El-Rayan

Scientific classification
- Kingdom: Animalia
- Phylum: Arthropoda
- Class: Insecta
- Order: Mantodea
- Family: Eremiaphilidae
- Subfamily: Eremiaphilinae
- Genus: Heteronutarsus; Lefebvre, 1835

= Heteronutarsus =

Genus of insects

Heteronutarsus is a genus of mantises belonging to the family Eremiaphilidae.

The species of this genus are found in Northern Africa.

Species:

- Heteronutarsus aegyptiacus Lefebvre, 1835
- Heteronutarsus albipennis Chopard, 1941
- Heteronutarsus arenivagus Chopard, 1955
- Heteronutarsus zolotarevskyi Chopard, 1940
