= Dysaules (mantis) =

Scientific classification
- Kingdom: Animalia
- Phylum: Arthropoda
- Clade: Pancrustacea
- Class: Insecta
- Order: Mantodea
- Family: Eremiaphilidae
- Subfamily: Iridinae
- Genus: Dysaules; Stal, 1877

Species
- See text

Synonyms
- Parepiscopus Westwood, 1889

Genus of praying mantises

Dysaules is a genus of praying mantis in the subfamily Iridinae.

== Species ==
- Dysaules brevipennis
- Dysaules himalayanus
- Dysaules longicollis
- Dysaules uvana

== See also ==
- List of mantis genera and species
