= Ariusia =

Ariusia_conspersa

Scientific classification
- Kingdom: Animalia
- Phylum: Arthropoda
- Clade: Pancrustacea
- Class: Insecta
- Order: Mantodea
- Family: Eremiaphilidae
- Genus: Ariusia; Stal, 1877
- Species: A. conspersa

Binomial name
- Ariusia conspersa Stal, 1877

Synonyms
- (Genus): Charieisilla Giglio-Tos, 1907; (Species): Ariusia cara Giglio-Tos, 1907

Genus of praying mantises

Ariusia is a genus of praying mantises in the family Eremiaphilidae. It contains only one species, Ariusia conspersa.

== See also ==
- List of mantis genera and species
