= Charieis =

Scientific classification
- Domain: Eukaryota
- Kingdom: Animalia
- Phylum: Arthropoda
- Class: Insecta
- Order: Mantodea
- Family: Eremiaphilidae
- Tribe: Tarachodini
- Genus: Charieis; Burr, 1900
- Species: C. peeli

Binomial name
- Charieis peeli Burr, 1900

Genus of praying mantises

Charieis is a genus of mantids in the family Tarachodidae. It is a monotypic genus with a single recognised species, Charieis peeli.
