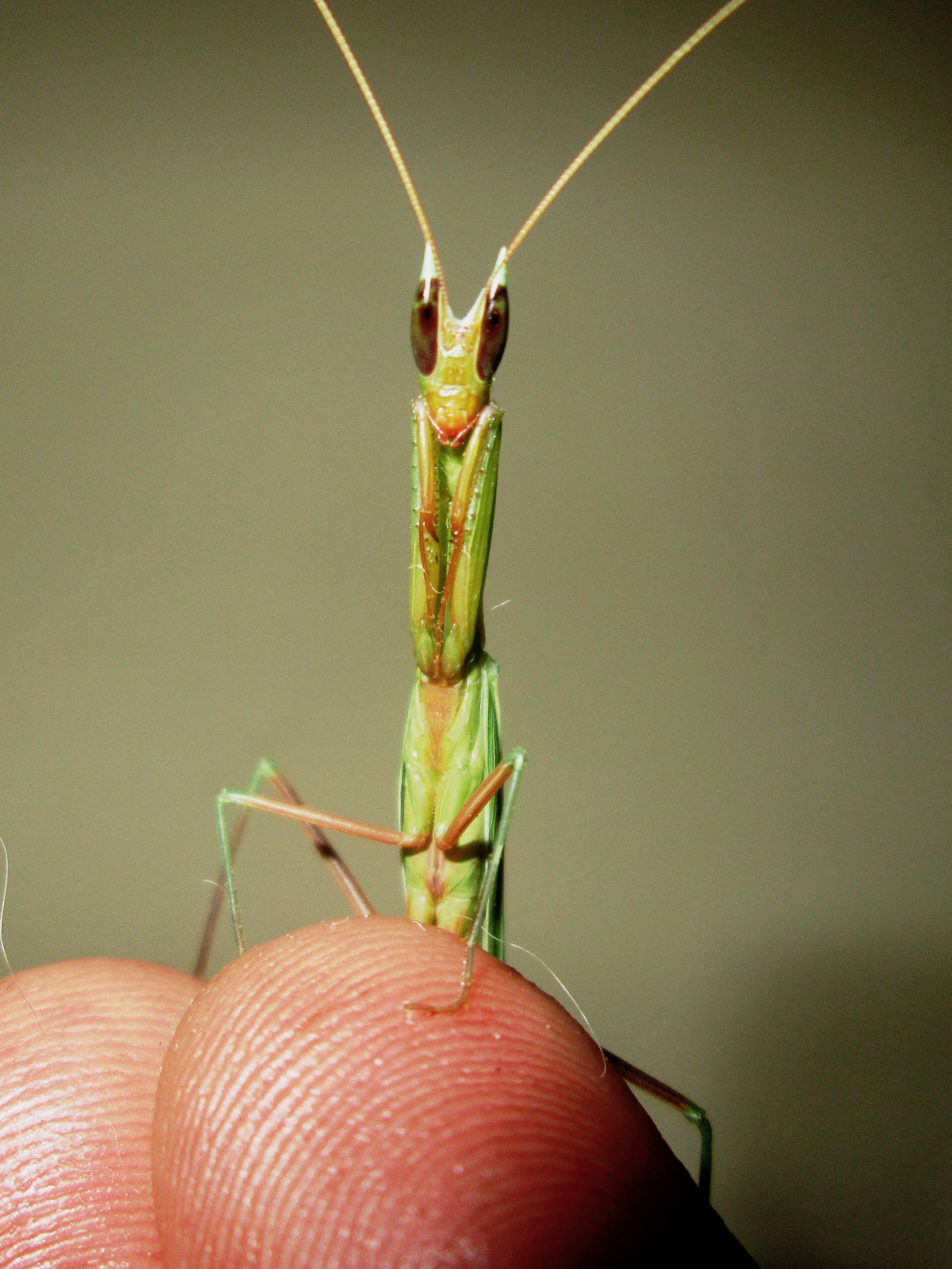

Scientific classification
- Kingdom: Animalia
- Phylum: Arthropoda
- Clade: Pancrustacea
- Class: Insecta
- Order: Mantodea
- Family: Eremiaphilidae
- Genus: Episcopomantis
- Species: E. chalybea

Binomial name
- Episcopomantis chalybea Burmeister, 1838

= Episcopomantis chalybea =

Species of mantis

Episcopomantis chalybea, also known as the Doublecone Grass Mantis, is a species of mantis from the family Eremiaphilidae native to southern Africa.

== See also ==
- List of mantis genera and species
