= Tarachodes afzelii =

Scientific classification
- Kingdom: Animalia
- Phylum: Arthropoda
- Clade: Pancrustacea
- Class: Insecta
- Order: Mantodea
- Family: Eremiaphilidae
- Genus: Tarachodes
- Species: T. afzelii

Binomial name
- Tarachodes afzelii Stal, 1871

Synonyms
- Tarachodes bandanus Giglio-Tos, 1917; Tarachodes griffinii Giglio-Tos, 1911; Tarachodes irrorata Gerstaecker, 1883

Species of praying mantis

Tarachodes afzelii, commonly known as the Tanzanian ground mantis, is a species of praying mantis in the family Eremiaphilidae. It is native to woodland in Western and Central Africa.

== Description ==
Tarachodes afzelii protects itself using camouflage. It is an olive-brown or grey-brown colour, sometimes with dark bars or a dark midline, which makes it resemble the bark of the trees on which it lives. The body is flattened and held pressed against the surface of the trunk or branch so that its shadow does not give it away. Males have grey wings, which make them rather easier to detect, and females have vestigial wings and are unable to fly.

== Distribution ==
Tarachodes afzelii is native to Central and West Africa where it is found in the savannah woodlands that separate the rainforest from drier grassland.

== Ecology ==
Most mantids do not guard their eggs or care for their young. The female Tarachodes afzelii lays a batch of up to two hundred eggs contained in a cryptically-coloured ootheca. She then broods the eggs by concealing the ootheca under her abdomen as she rests on the bark. She defends the eggs by driving away the tiny torymid wasps that try to lay their eggs inside the ootheca, and the ants and beetles that would like to feed on the eggs. Although the eggs can develop without the mother brooding them, the hatching success rate is much lower in unbrooded eggs.

Remarkably, Tarachodes afzelii continues her care of her nymphs after they hatch out in about three weeks. For about two days, they cluster round her, and gather together again in her vicinity after a disturbance. At this stage they are vulnerable to attack by jumping spiders, and ants of the genera Dorylus and Megaponera. It is conceivable that the female might catch prey and allow her offspring to consume it, but such behaviour has not been observed.

The first and second instars are Batesian mimics of black ants, while bigger instars and adults, neither of which are ant mimics, are predators of those same ants.

== See also ==
- List of mantis genera and species
