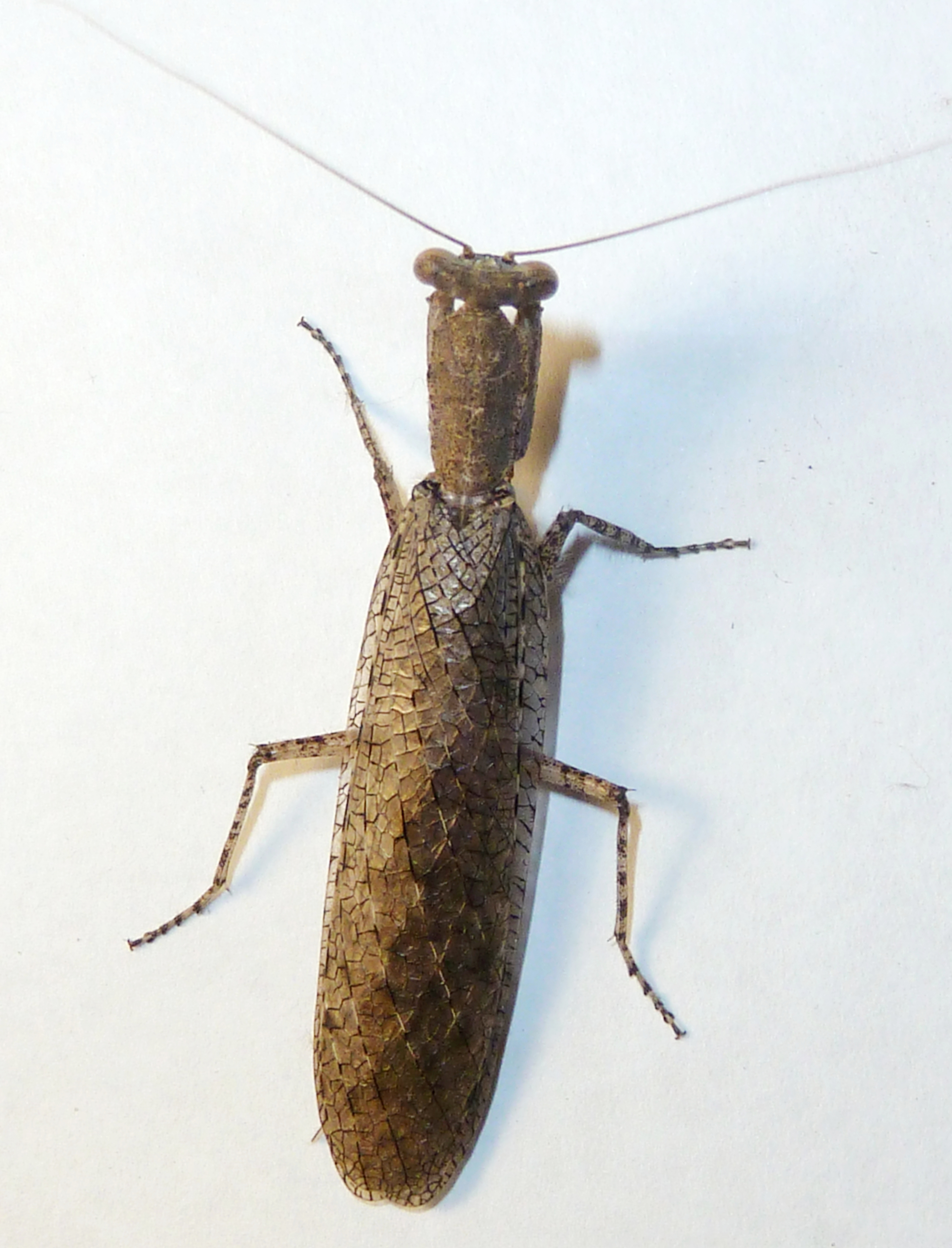

Scientific classification
- Kingdom: Animalia
- Phylum: Arthropoda
- Clade: Pancrustacea
- Class: Insecta
- Order: Mantodea
- Family: Eremiaphilidae
- Subfamily: Tarachodinae
- Genus: Tarachodes; Burmeister, 1838

Species
- Many, see text

= Tarachodes =

Genus of praying mantises

The bark mantises and ground mantises (genus Tarachodes) are praying mantises now placed in the family Eremiaphilidae that are native to the Afrotropics. They are generally light brown but more silvery on the wings. The wings are attractively reticulated, and the veins may be mottled dark and pale. The head is wider than the pronotum, which is rounded anteriorly, and doesn't overlap with the rear of the head. The pronotum is depressed, with its sides more or less parallel, and only a weak supra-coxal bulge is present. The anterior tibia are flattened and greatly expanded longitudinally, and the tibial claw does not fit into a pit between the 1st and 2nd external spines of the anterior femora, as in a few mantis groups.

These mantises are ambush predators and many species are cryptically coloured to blend in with their surroundings. Some have brightly coloured undersides which are displayed to startle and drive off assailants. Some species such as Tarachodes maurus brood their eggs, and others, such as Tarachodes afzelii, not only brood their eggs but continue to guard their young after they hatch out.

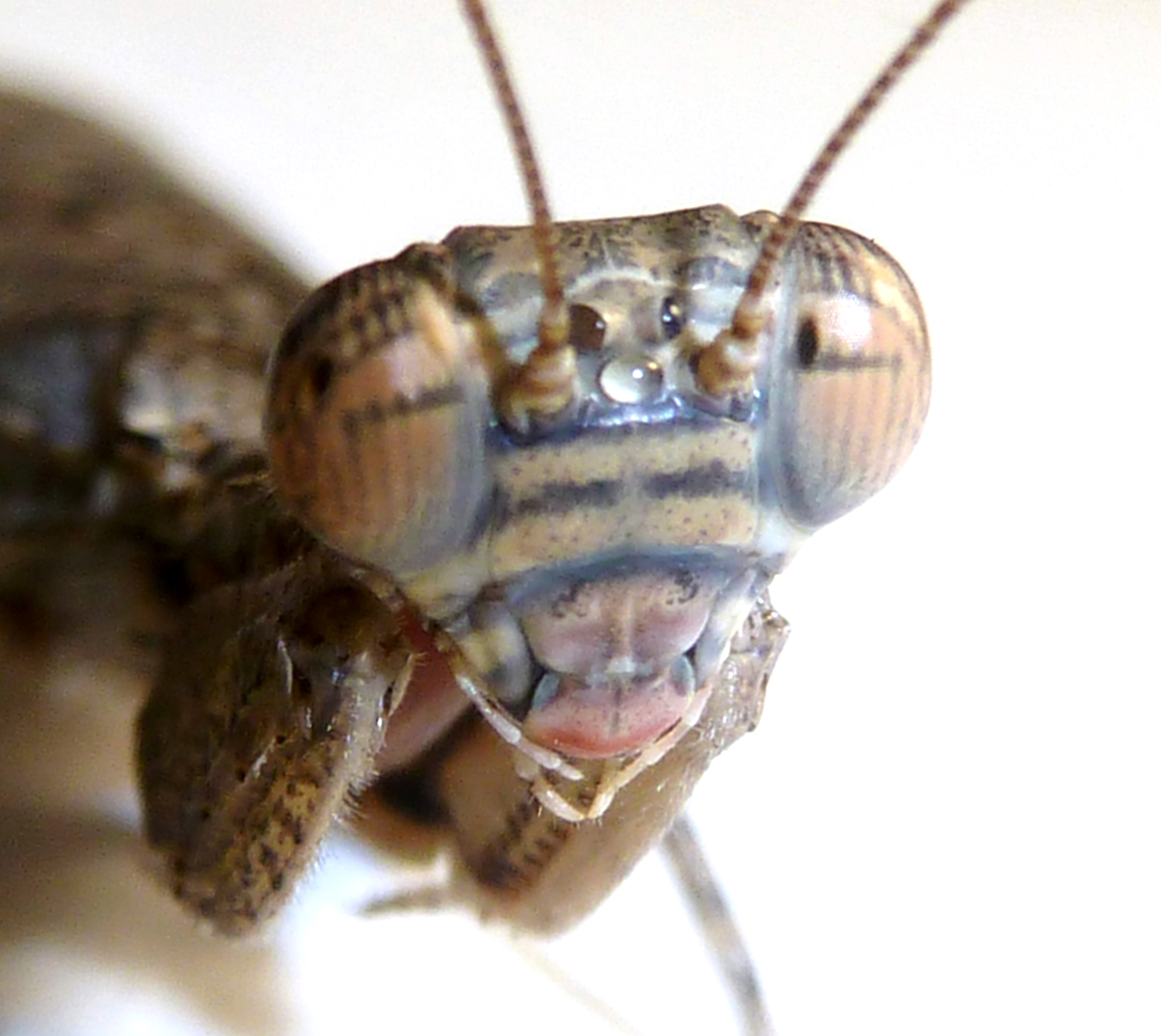
Face

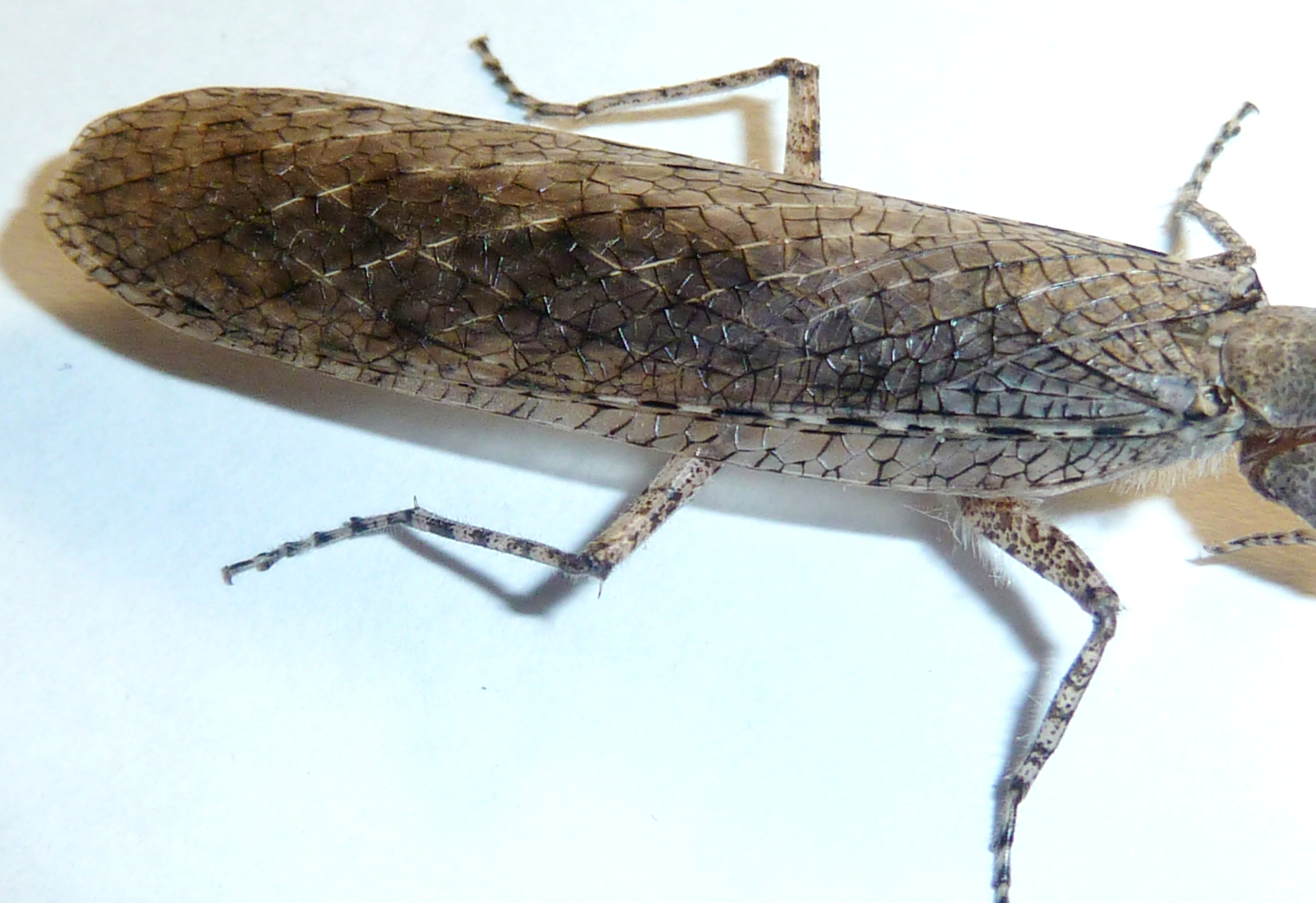
Reticulated wings

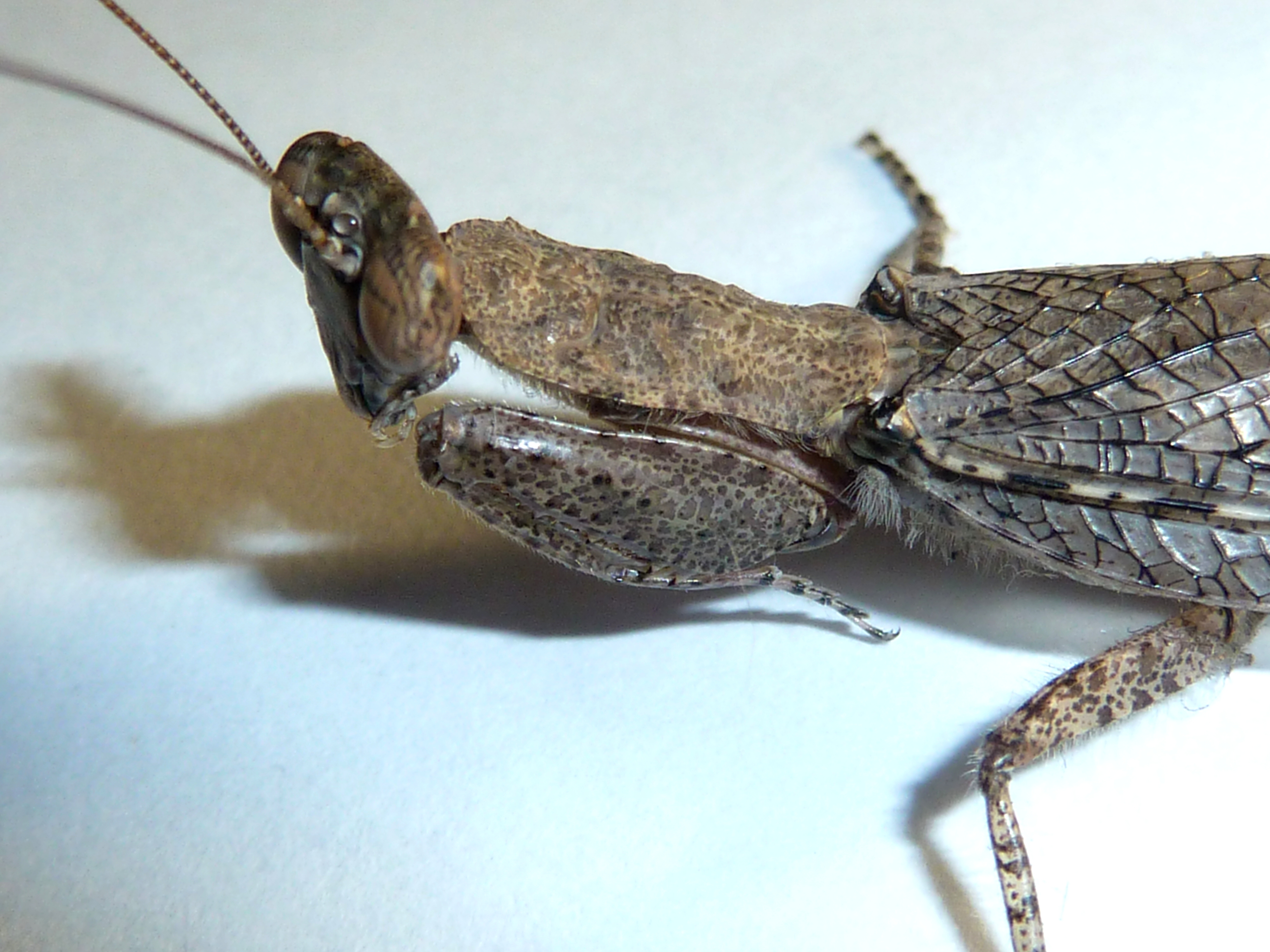
Pronotum, front legs

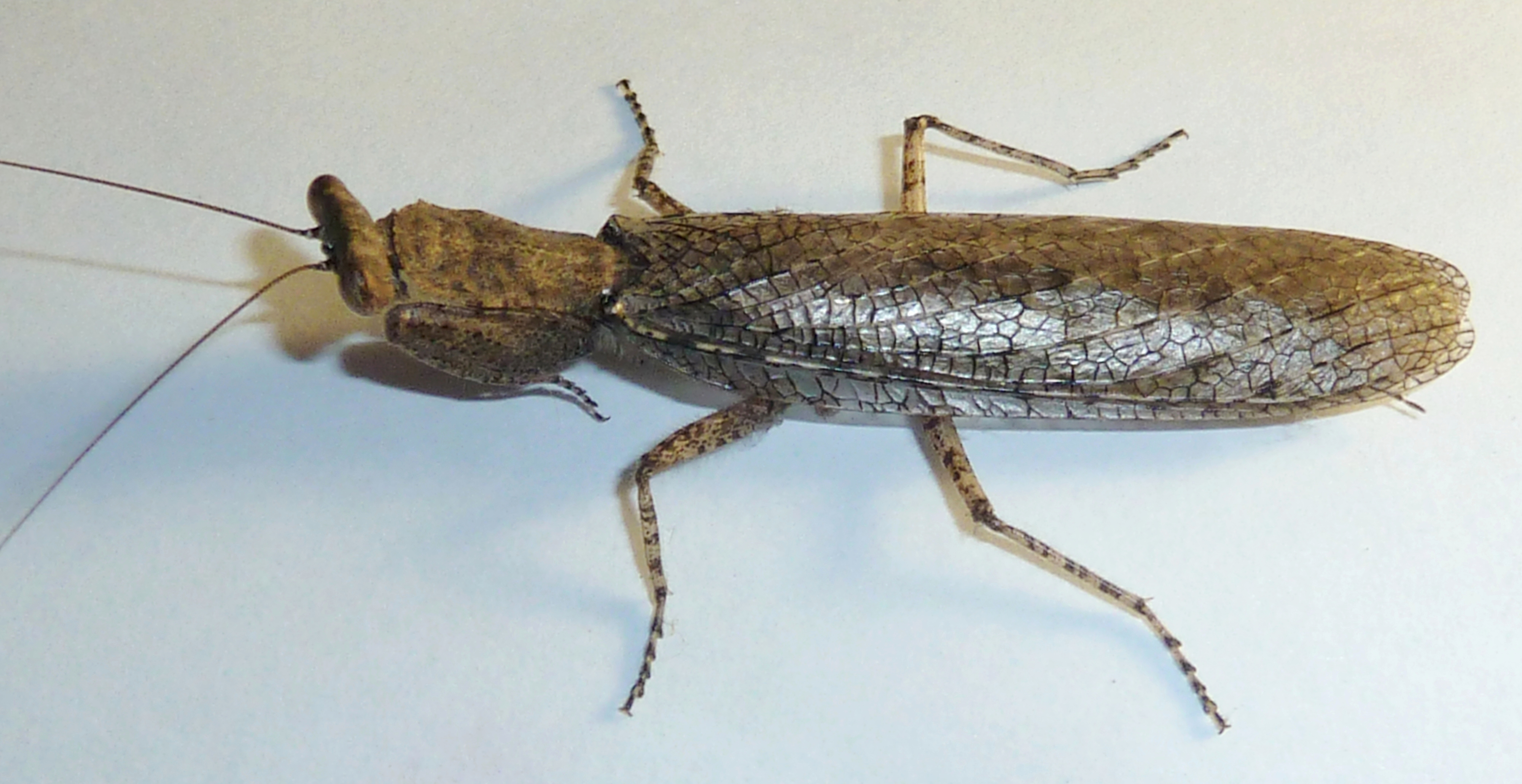
Full body

== Species ==
Members of this genus may be called Bark mantises or Ground mantises.

- Tarachodes abyssinicus
- Tarachodes aestuans
- Tarachodes afzelii (Tanzanian ground mantis)
- Tarachodes alluaudi
- Tarachodes arabicus
- Tarachodes basinotatus
- Tarachodes beieri
- Tarachodes betakarschi
- Tarachodes bicornis (two-horned mantis)
- Tarachodes bispinosus
- Tarachodes brevipennis
- Tarachodes chopardi
- Tarachodes circulifer
- Tarachodes circuliferoides
- Tarachodes davidi
- Tarachodes dissimulator
- Tarachodes dives
- Tarachodes feae
- Tarachodes fraterculus
- Tarachodes fuscipennis
- Tarachodes gerstaeckeri
- Tarachodes gibber
- Tarachodes gigas
- Tarachodes gilvus
- Tarachodes griseus
- Tarachodes haedus
- Tarachodes insidiator
- Tarachodes karschi
- Tarachodes lucubrans
- Tarachodes maculisternum
- Tarachodes maurus
- Tarachodes minor
- Tarachodes modesta
- Tarachodes monstrosus
- Tarachodes namibiensis
- Tarachodes natalensis
- Tarachodes nubifer
- Tarachodes nyassanus
- Tarachodes obscuripennis
- Tarachodes obtusiceps
- Tarachodes okahandyanus
- Tarachodes oxynotus
- Tarachodes perloides
- Tarachodes pilosipes
- Tarachodes pujoli
- Tarachodes rhodesicus
- Tarachodes robustus
- Tarachodes rotundiceps
- Tarachodes sanctus
- Tarachodes saussurei
- Tarachodes schulthessi
- Tarachodes severini
- Tarachodes similis
- Tarachodes sjostedti
- Tarachodes smithi
- Tarachodes taboranus
- Tarachodes tananus
- Tarachodes taramassi
- Tarachodes ugandensis
- Tarachodes usambaricus
- Tarachodes vitreus
- Tarachodes werneri

== See also ==
- List of mantis genera and species
