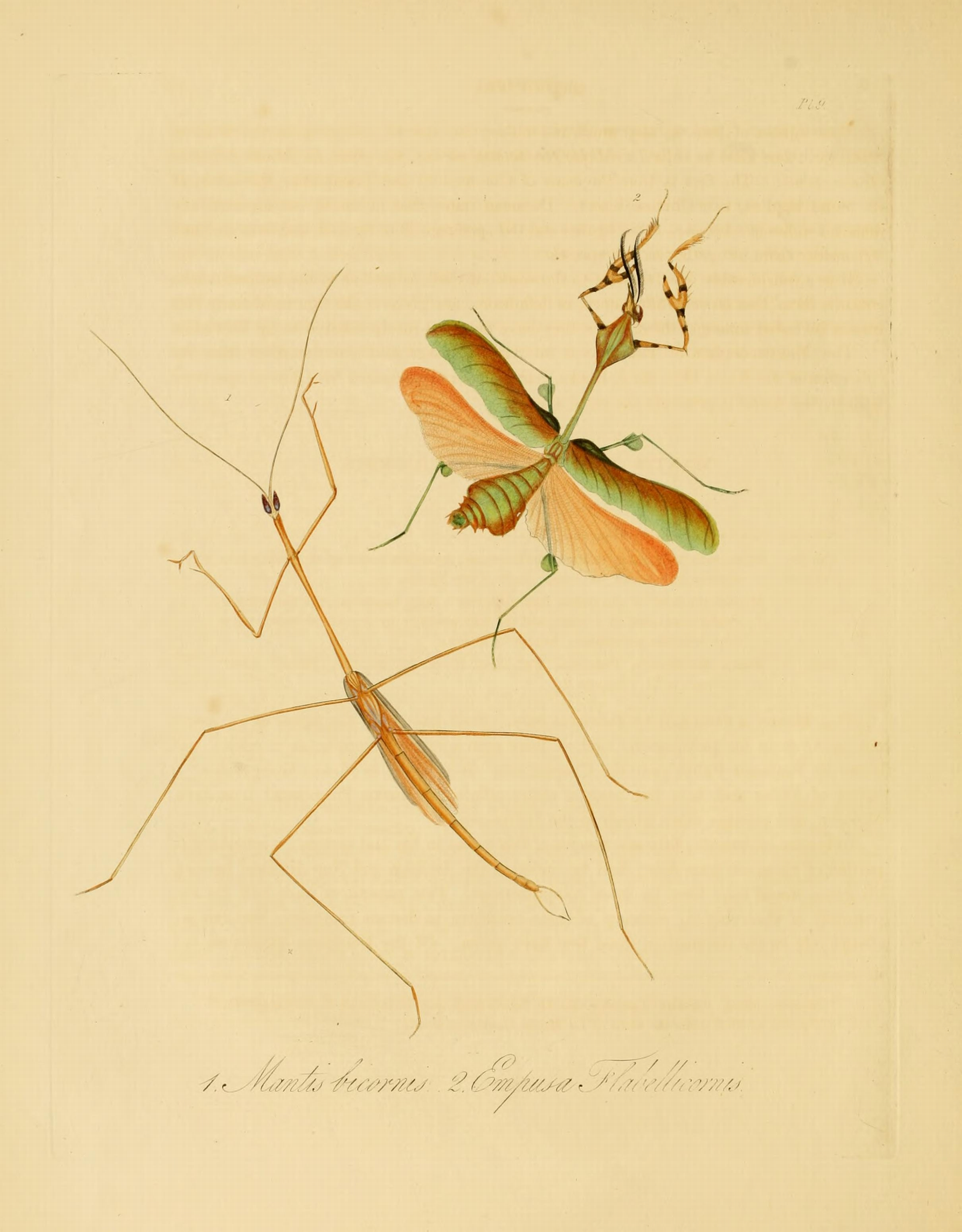
- Illustration (lower left)

Scientific classification
- Kingdom: Animalia
- Phylum: Arthropoda
- Class: Insecta
- Order: Mantodea
- Family: Eremiaphilidae
- Subfamily: Iridinae
- Tribe: Schizocephalini
- Genus: Schizocephala; Serville, 1831
- Species: S. bicornis

Binomial name
- Schizocephala bicornis (Linnaeus, 1758)

Synonyms
- Gryllus bicornis Linnaeus, 1758; Schizocephala oculata Fabricius, 1781; Schizocephala stricta Olivier, 1792

= Schizocephala =

Genus of praying mantises

Schizocephala is a genus of praying mantises in the monotypic tribe Schizocephalini. It is represented by a single species, Schizocephala bicornis. It is distributed across Pakistan, India, Nepal, Sri Lanka and the Sunda Islands.

== Gallery ==
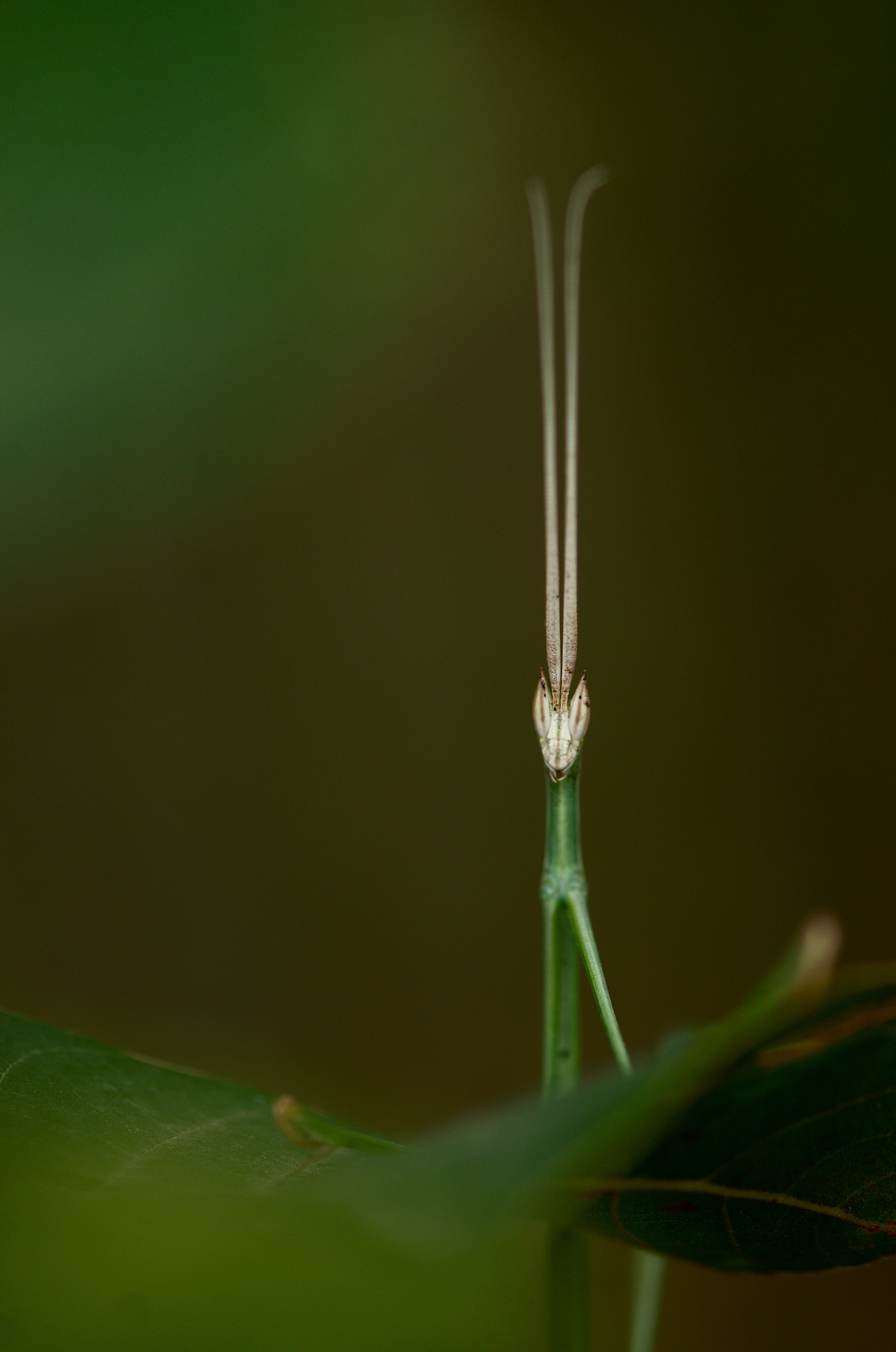
Schizocephala bicornis at Bangalore

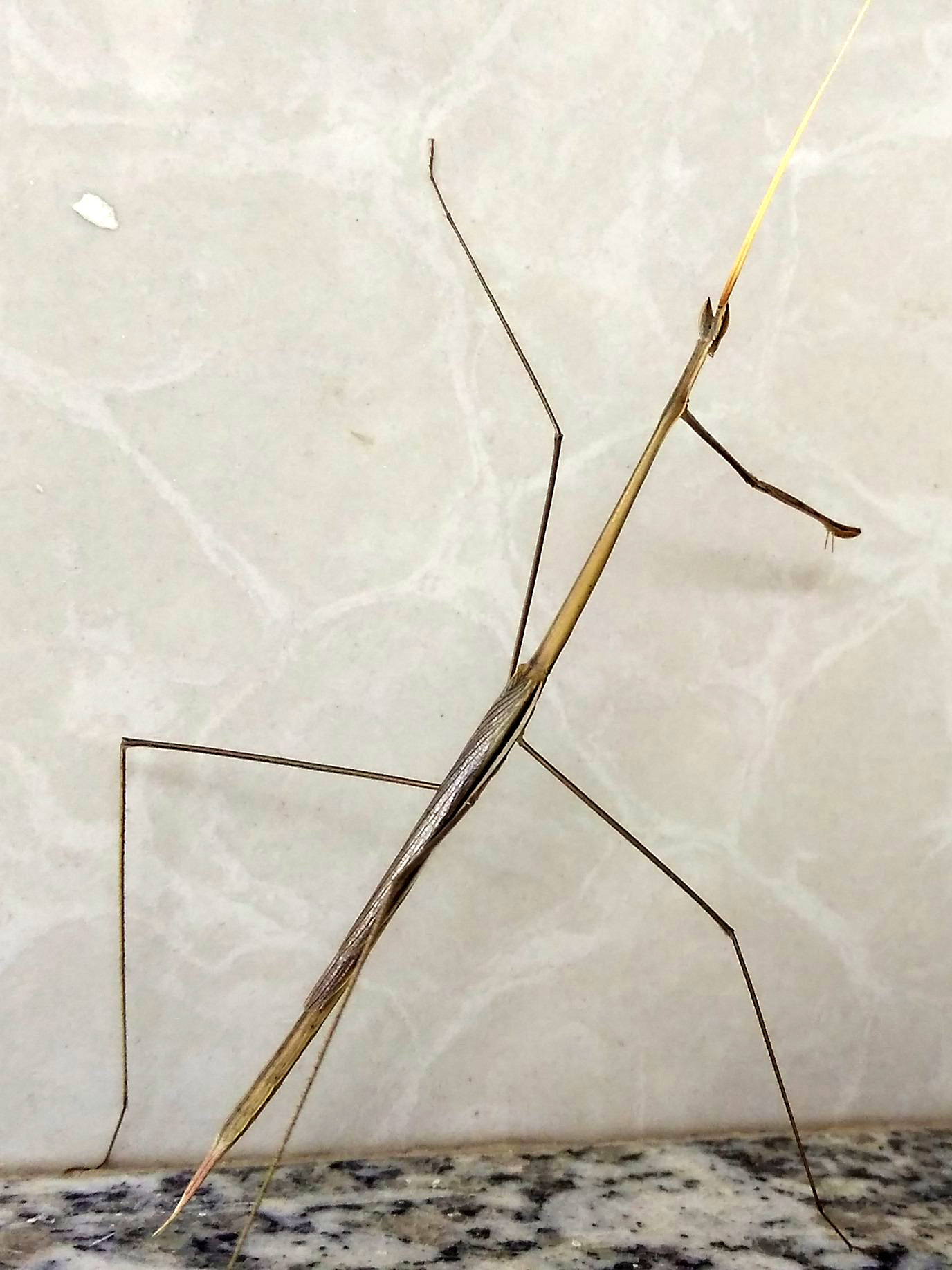
Indian Stick Mantis closeup

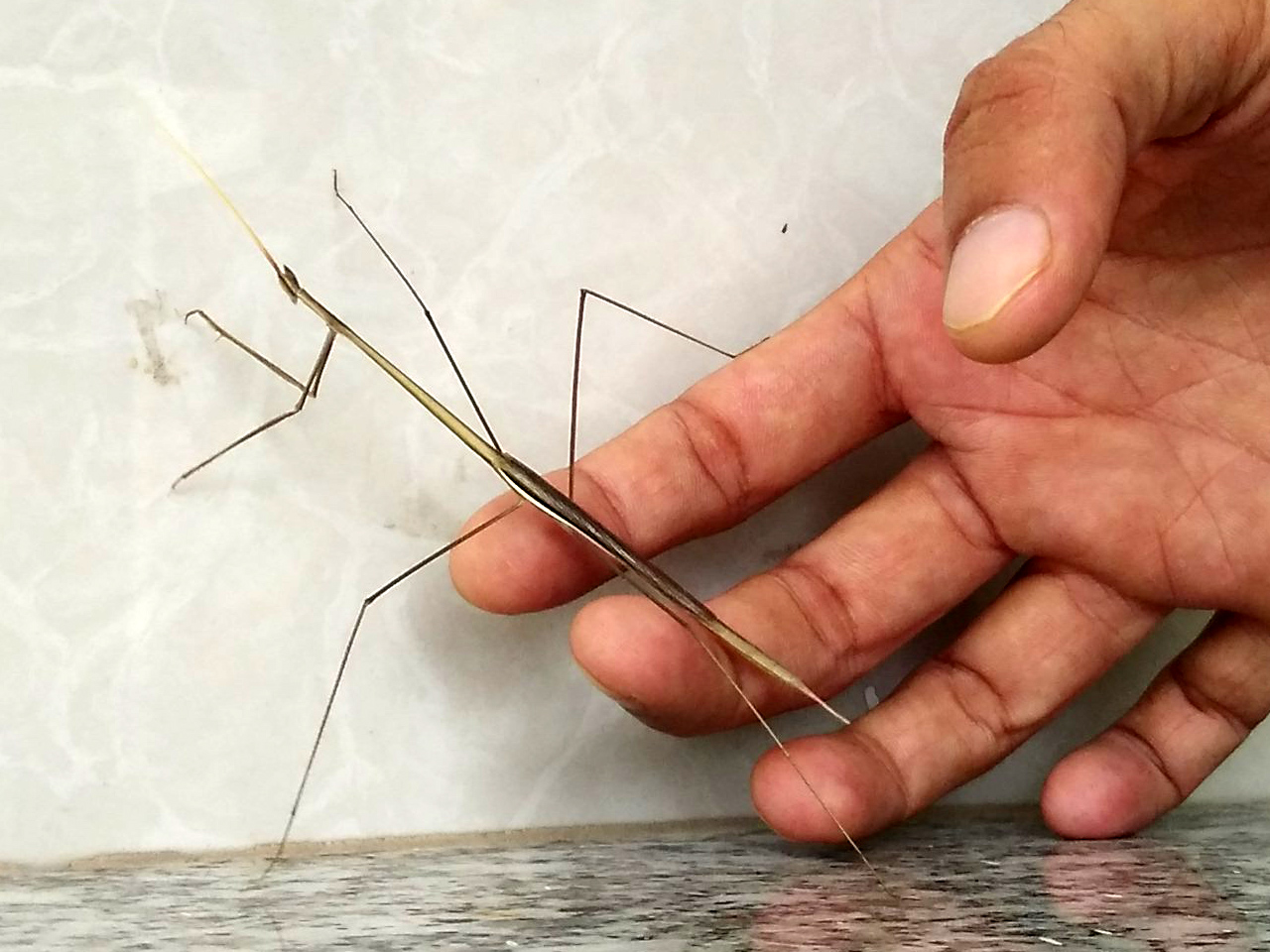
Indian Stick Mantis Size

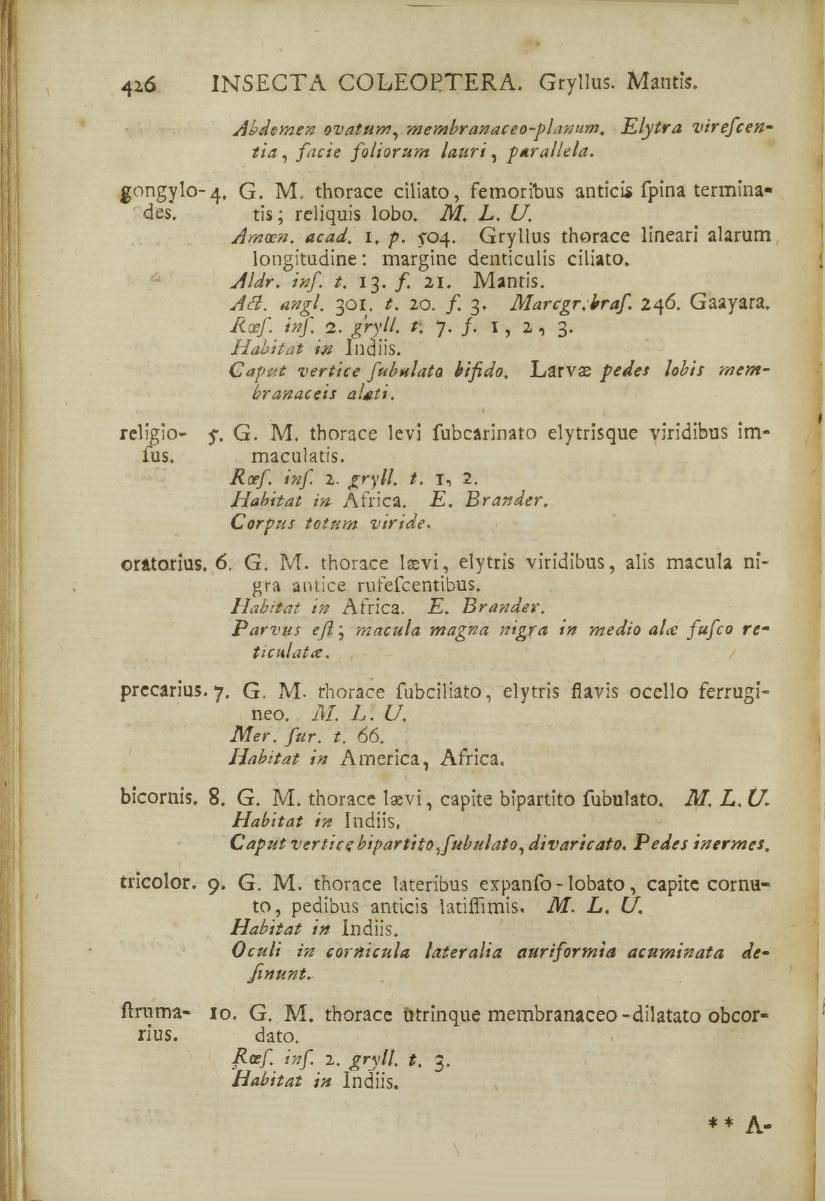
Original description by Carl Linnaeus
