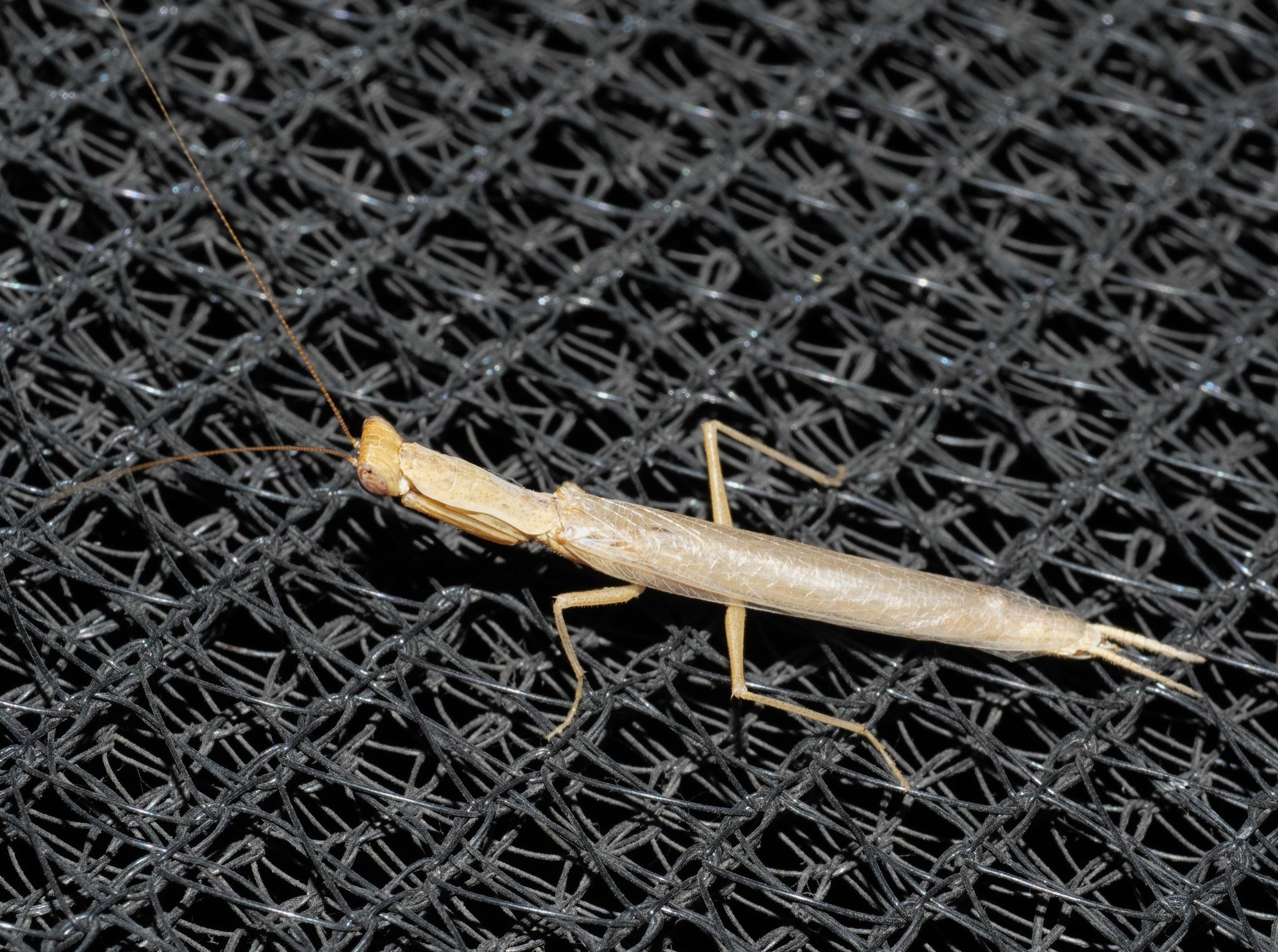
- Galepsus, Botswana

Scientific classification
- Kingdom: Animalia
- Phylum: Arthropoda
- Clade: Pancrustacea
- Class: Insecta
- Order: Mantodea
- Family: Eremiaphilidae
- Subfamily: Tarachodinae
- Tribe: Tarachodini
- Subtribe: Tarachodina
- Genus: Galepsus; Stal, 1876

Subgenera
- Galepsus Stål, 1876; Lygdamia Stål, 1877; Onychogalepsus Beier, 1954; Syngalepsus Beier, 1954

Synonyms
- Lygdamia Stål, 1877; Onychogalepsus Beier, 1954; Synagalepsus Beier, 1954

= Galepsus (mantis) =

Genus of mantises

Galepsus is a genus of mantids in the family Eremiaphilidae. There are more than 60 described species in Galepsus, found in Sub-Saharan Africa.

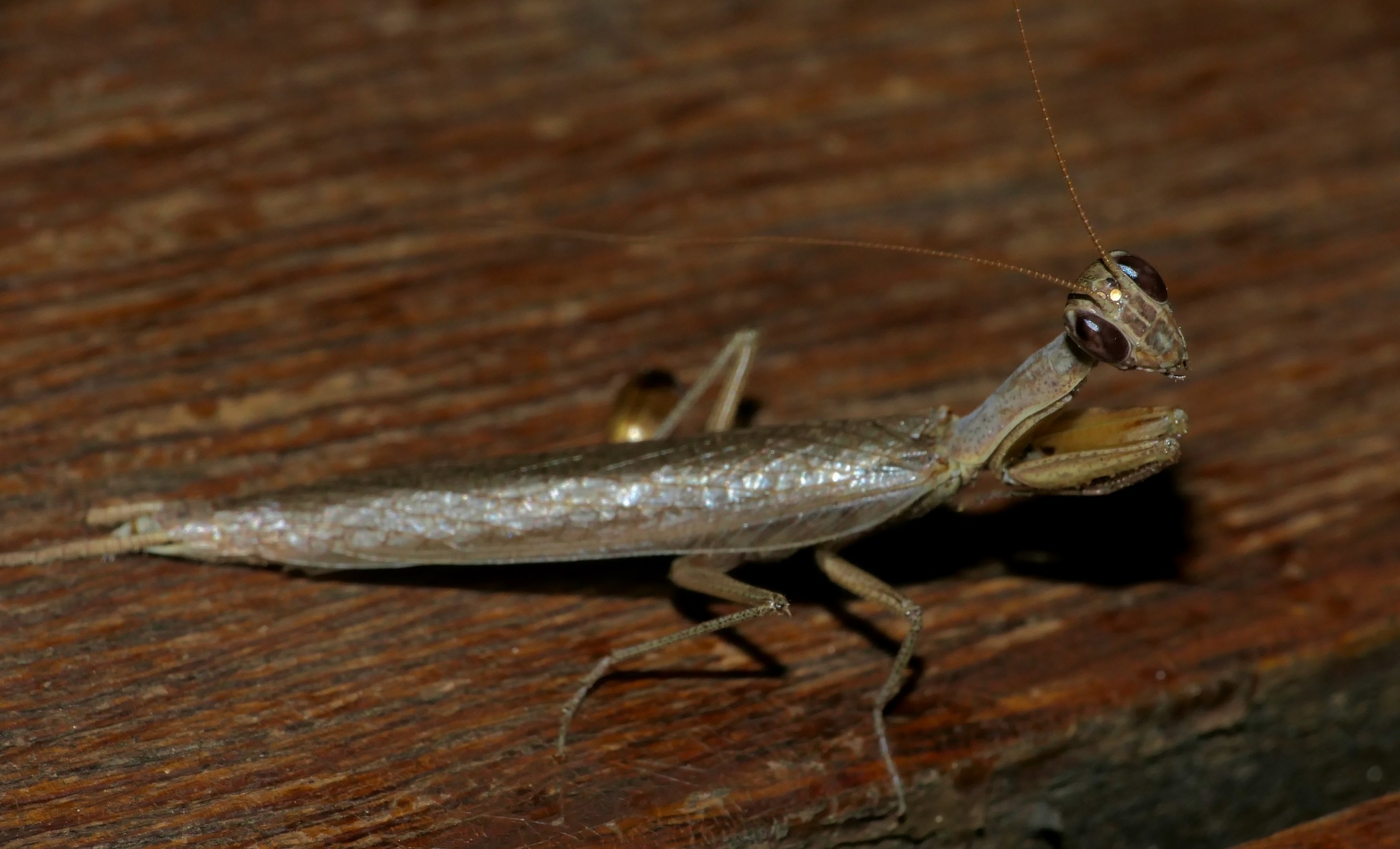
Galepsus, South Africa

== Species ==
These 67 species belong to the genus Galepsus:

- Galepsus aberrans Kaltenbach, 1996
- Galepsus affinis Giglio-Tos, 1911
- Galepsus angolensis Werner, 1907
- Galepsus beieri Kaltenbach, 1996
- Galepsus binotatus La Greca, 1950
- Galepsus bioculatus Beier, 1957
- Galepsus bipunctatus Beier, 1931
- Galepsus birkenmeierae Beier, 1969
- Galepsus bispinosus Beier, 1957
- Galepsus brincki Beier, 1955
- Galepsus brunneri Giglio-Tos, 1911
- Galepsus bucheti Moulin, 2018
- Galepsus buettneri Giglio-Tos, 1911
- Galepsus cacuminatus Beier, 1954
- Galepsus capensis Beier, 1930
- Galepsus capitatus Saussure, 1869
- Galepsus centralis Beier, 1957
- Galepsus cliquennoisi Roy, 2005
- Galepsus congicus Rehn, 1912
- Galepsus coronatus La Greca, 1952
- Galepsus culminans Beier, 1954
- Galepsus damaranus Giglio-Tos, 1911
- Galepsus decipiens Beier, 1950
- Galepsus denigratus Beier, 1954
- Galepsus diversus Giglio-Tos, 1911
- Galepsus dubius Giglio-Tos, 1911
- Galepsus dudleyi Moulin, 2018
- Galepsus erythraeus Giglio-Tos, 1911
- Galepsus fallaciosus Beier, 1957
- Galepsus fallax La Greca, 1955
- Galepsus feae Giglio-Tos, 1911
- Galepsus femoratus Giglio-Tos, 1911
- Galepsus focki Werner, 1923
- Galepsus fumipennis Beier, 1954
- Galepsus globiceps Beier, 1942
- Galepsus gracilis Giglio-Tos, 1911
- Galepsus inermis Giglio-Tos, 1916
- Galepsus intermedius Werner, 1907
- Galepsus konakrynus Giglio-Tos, 1911
- Galepsus laticeps Werner, 1907
- Galepsus lenticularis (Saussure, 1872)
- Galepsus letabaensis Kaltenbach, 1996
- Galepsus machadoi Beier, 1969
- Galepsus malawiensis Beier, 1969
- Galepsus meridionalis (Saussure, 1872)
- Galepsus minima Werner, 1907
- Galepsus minutus Giglio-Tos, 1911
- Galepsus montanus Werner, 1907
- Galepsus nigricoxa Giglio-Tos, 1927
- Galepsus nimulensis Giglio-Tos, 1917
- Galepsus nyassensis Giglio-Tos, 1911
- Galepsus oxycephalus (Gerstaecker, 1883)
- Galepsus pentheri Giglio-Tos, 1911
- Galepsus rhodesicus Beier, 1954
- Galepsus rouxi Werner, 1929
- Galepsus schwetzi Beier, 1957
- Galepsus scorteccii La Greca, 1956
- Galepsus signatus Beier, 1954
- Galepsus sudanensis Beier, 1954
- Galepsus supervacaneus Beier, 1954
- Galepsus tenuis Stal, 1877
- Galepsus thomseni Werner, 1923
- Galepsus transvaalensis Beier, 1954
- Galepsus trilobus Giglio-Tos, 1911
- Galepsus ulricae Kaltenbach, 1996
- Galepsus wittei Beier, 1954
- Galepsus zambesicus Giglio-Tos, 1911
