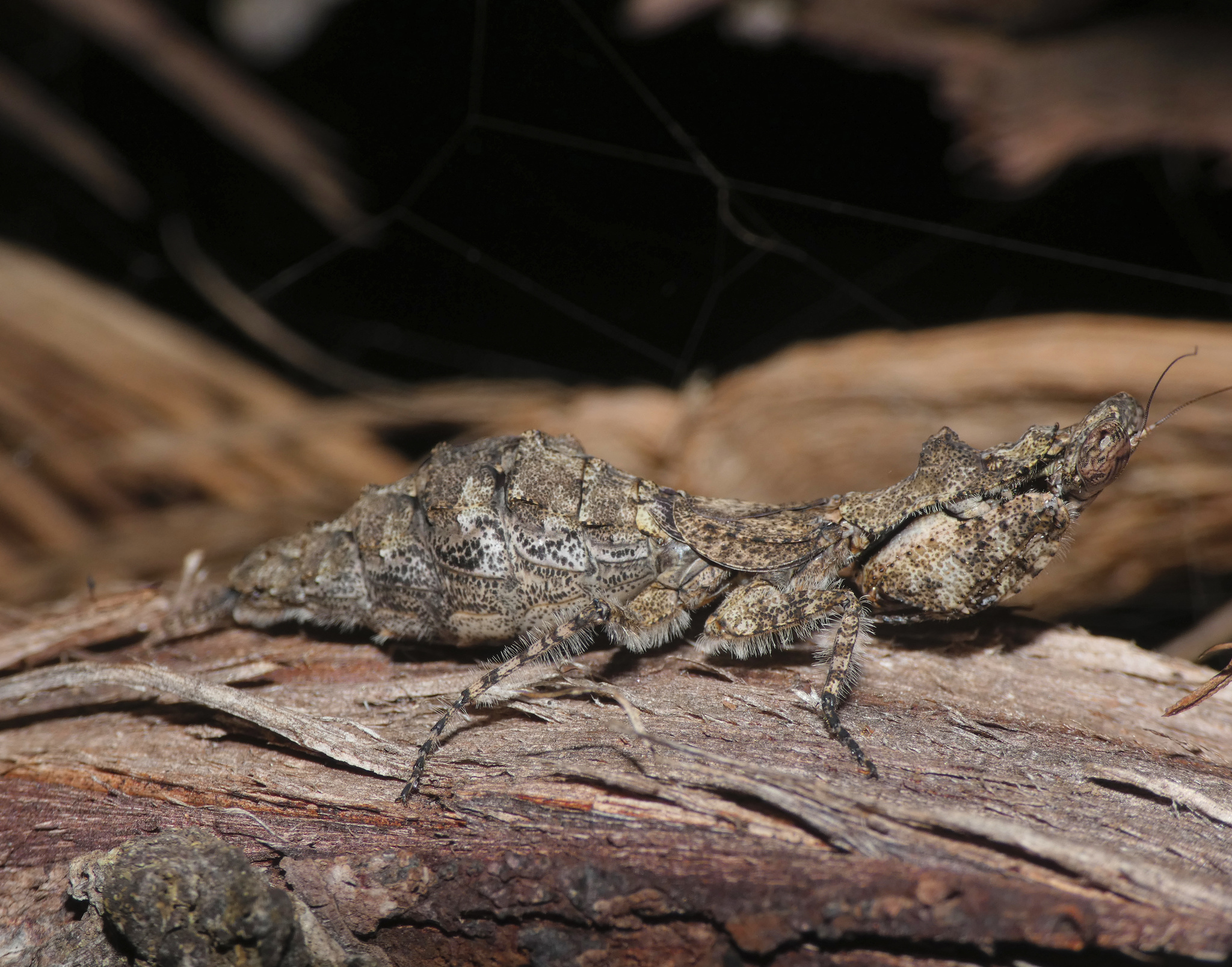
- Tarachodes sanctus in Zimbabwe

Scientific classification
- Kingdom: Animalia
- Phylum: Arthropoda
- Clade: Pancrustacea
- Class: Insecta
- Order: Mantodea
- Family: Eremiaphilidae
- Genus: Tarachodes
- Species: T. sanctus

Binomial name
- Tarachodes sanctus Saussure, 1871

= Tarachodes sanctus =

Species of praying mantis

Tarachodes sanctus is a species of praying mantis in the family Eremiaphilidae.

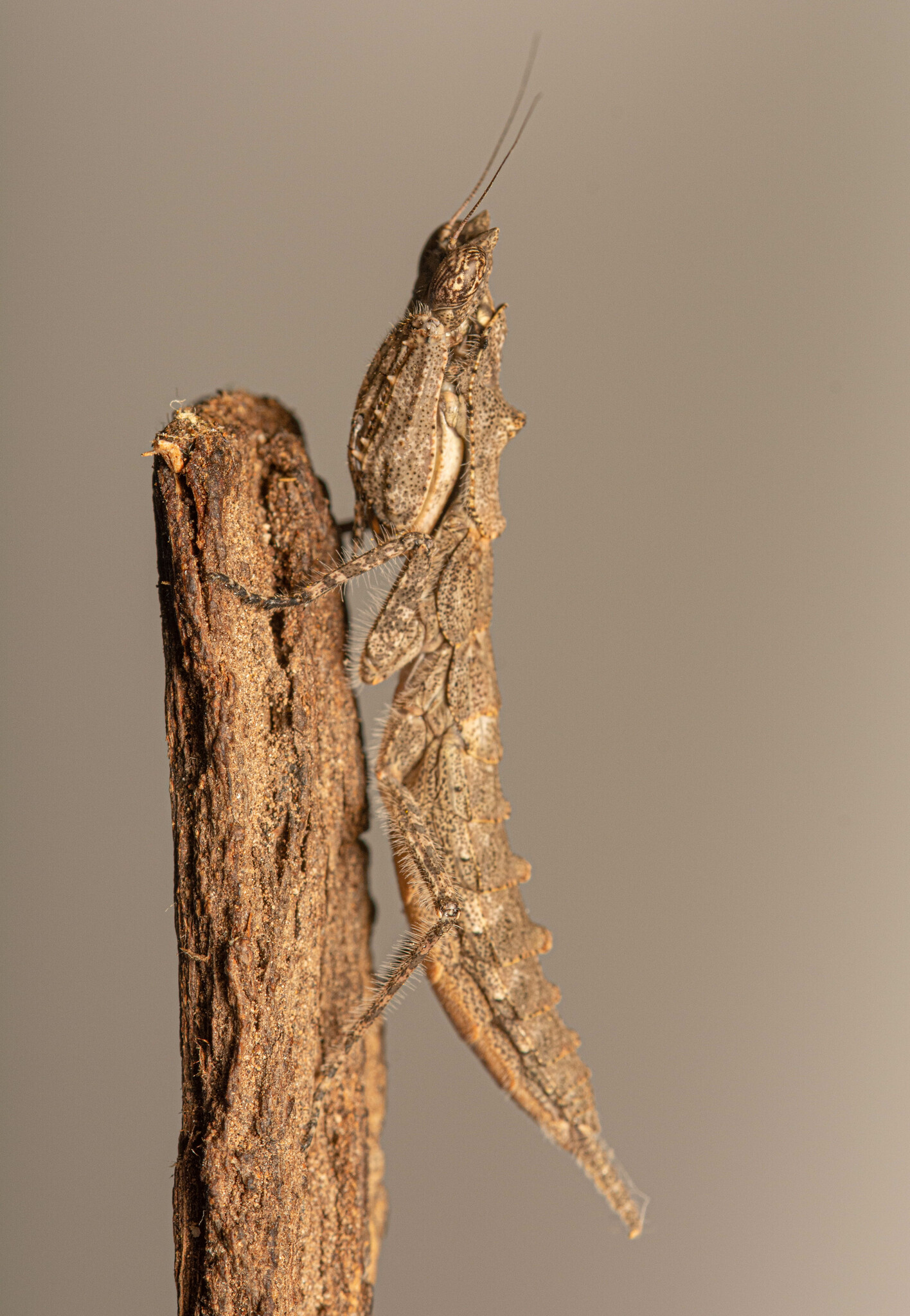
Holy Bark Mantid (Tarachodes sanctus) nymph in South Africa

== See also ==
- List of mantis genera and species
