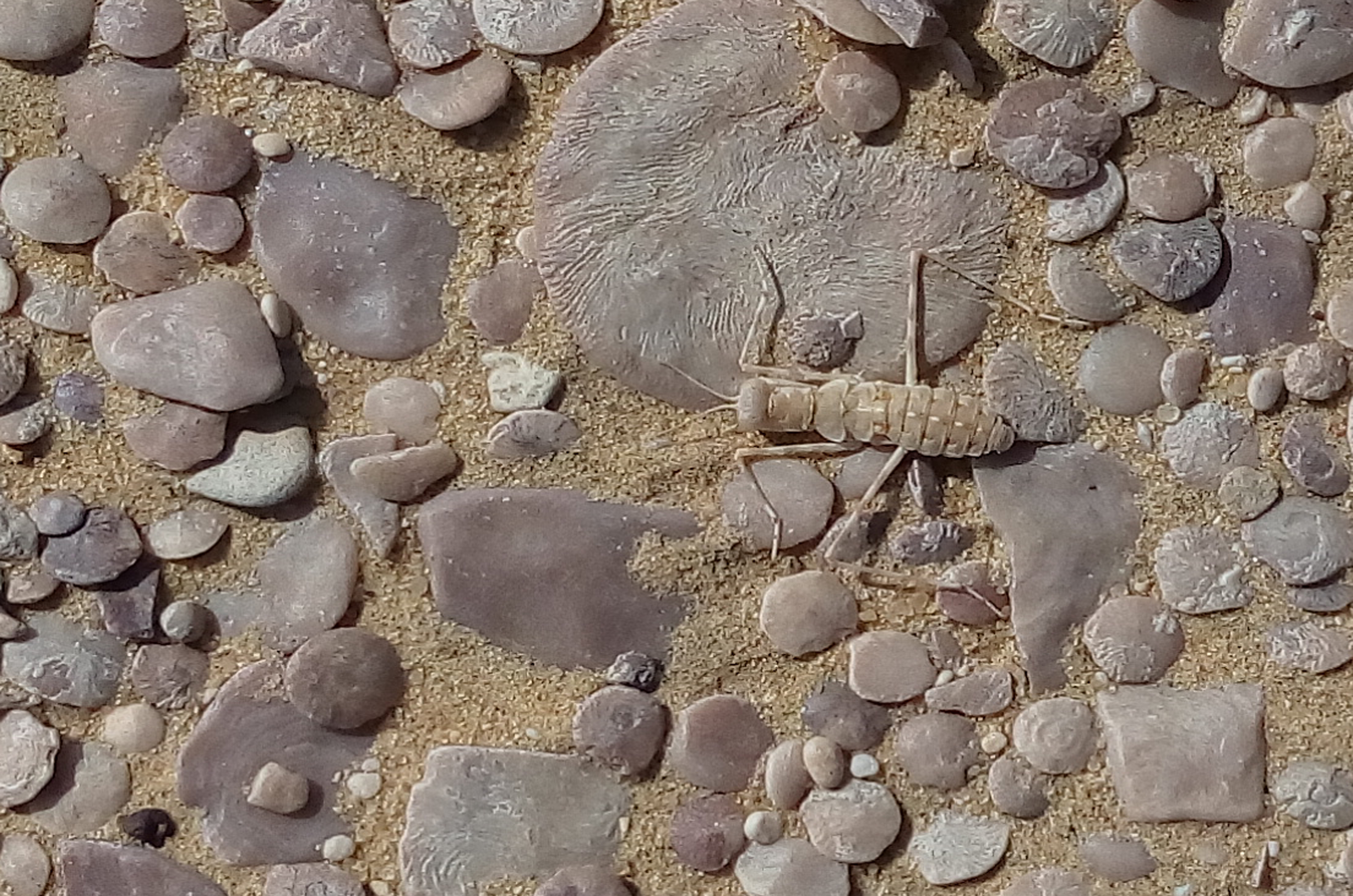
- Heteronutarsus aegyptiacus at Wadi Elrayan

Scientific classification
- Kingdom: Animalia
- Phylum: Arthropoda
- Clade: Pancrustacea
- Class: Insecta
- Order: Mantodea
- Clade: Heteromantodea
- Superfamily: Eremiaphiloidea
- Family: Eremiaphilidae; Wood-Mason, 1889

= Eremiaphilidae =

Family of mantis insects

Eremiaphilidae is a small Old World family of praying mantids, based on the type genus Eremiaphila. As part of a major revision of mantid taxonomy, this family now contains the subfamily Tarachodinae, which includes tribes and genera previously placed in the now obsolete Tarachodidae.

The new placement means that this taxon is characteristic of the superfamily Eremiaphiloidea (of group Cernomantodea) and infraorder Schizomantodea. Genera in this family have been recorded from: Africa and Asia.

== Subfamilies, tribes and selected genera ==
The Mantodea Species File lists four subfamilies:

=== Eremiaphilinae ===
Species in this small, original subfamily are frequently wingless or brachypterous, and commonly encountered in desert environments, from Egypt to temperate Asia. Their coloration often matches that of the sand or rocks in the habitat.

- Eremiaphila Lefebvre, 1835
- Heteronutarsus Lefebvre, 1835

=== Iridinae ===
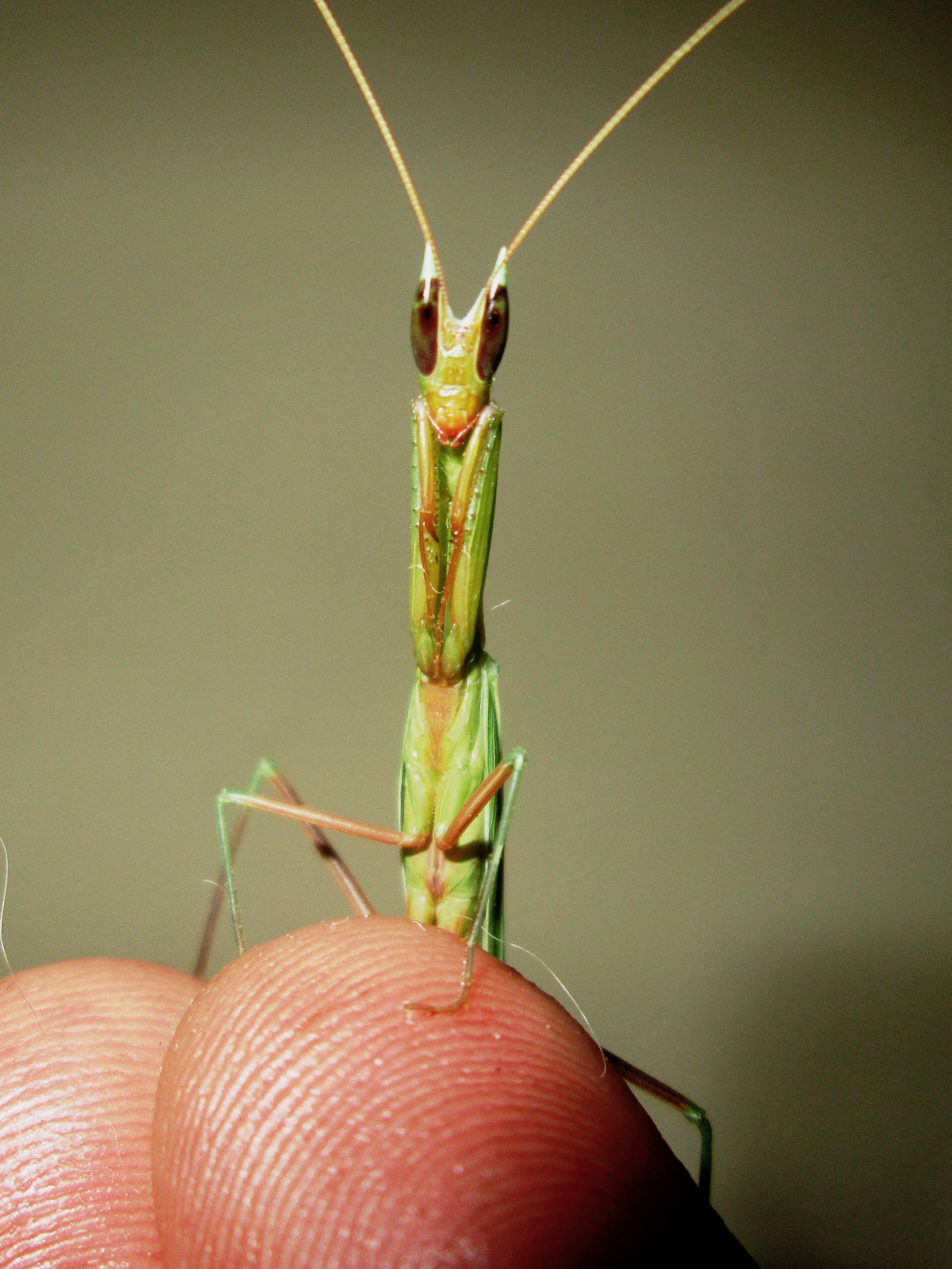
Episcopomantis chalybea

- tribe Didymocoryphini (monotypic)
  - Didymocorypha Wood-Mason, 1877
- tribe Dysaulini
  - Dysaules Stal, 1877
- tribe Iridini
  - Episcopomantis Uvarov, 1940
  - Iris Saussure, 1869
  - Paroxyophthalmus Wood-Mason, 1889
- tribe Schizocephalini (monotypic: was subfamily Schizocephalinae)
  - Schizocephala Serville, 1831

Parathespinae

- Parathespis Saussure, 1869

=== Tarachodinae ===
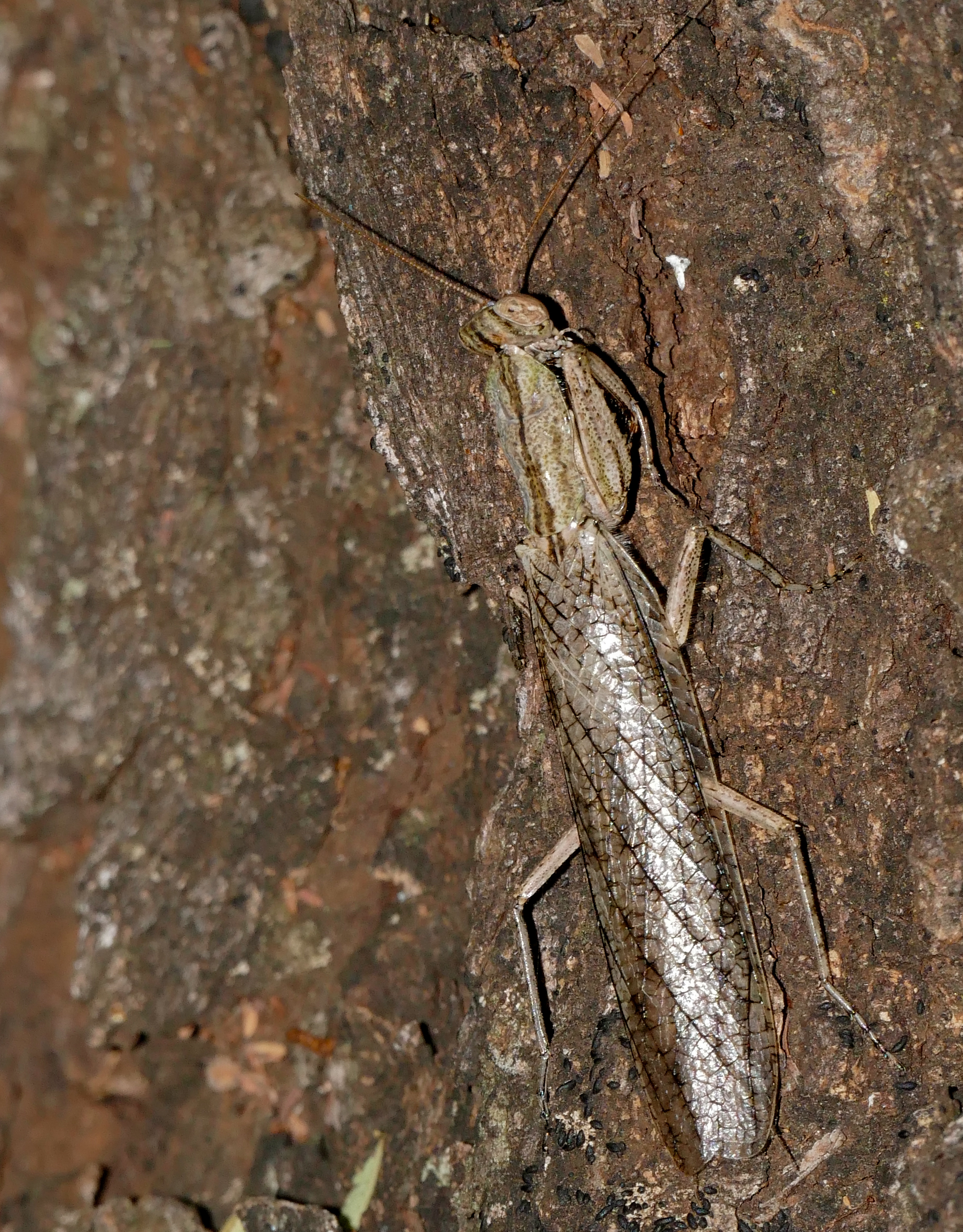
Tarachodes sp.

tribe Oxyelaeini

- Charieis Burr, 1900
- Oxyelaea Giglio-Tos, 1917

tribe Tarachodini

- subtribe Antistiina
  - Antistia Stal, 1876
  - Ariusia Stal, 1877
- subtribe Tarachodina
  - Galepsus Stal, 1876
  - Metagalepsus Roy, 1971
  - Nesogalepsus
  - Nothogalepsus
  - Oxyophthalmellus
  - Paragalepsus
  - Paralygdamia
  - Paroxyophthalmus
  - Plastogalepsus
  - Pseudogalepsus
  - Pyrgomantis
  - Tarachodella
  - Tarachodes Burmeister, 1838
  - Tarachodula
  - Tuberculepsus Roy, 2008
