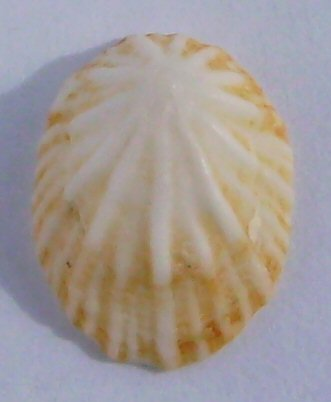
- A shell of a Hemitoma species from New Zealand, anterior end to the bottom

Scientific classification
- Kingdom: Animalia
- Phylum: Mollusca
- Class: Gastropoda
- Subclass: Vetigastropoda
- Order: Lepetellida
- Family: Fissurellidae
- Subfamily: Hemitominae
- Genus: Hemitoma; Swainson, 1840

Type species
- Emarginula tricostata Sowerby I, 1823

Species
- See text

Synonyms
- Subemarginula Gray, 1847

= Hemitoma =

Genus of gastropods

Hemitoma is a genus of slit limpets, marine gastropod molluscs in the family Fissurellidae, the keyhole limpets and slit limpets.

In this genus of fissurellid, there is an inconspicuous notch at the anterior end of the shell rather than a slit. The notch is best seen in an interior view of the shell.

== Species ==
Species within the genus Hemitoma include:

- Hemitoma australis (Quoy & Gaimard, 1832)
- Hemitoma bella Gabb, 1865

According to the World Register of Marine Species (WoRMS) the following species names have been accepted

- Hemitoma cumingii Sowerby II, 1863
- Hemitoma imbricata (Adams, 1851)
- Hemitoma octoradiata (Gmelin, 1791)
- Hemitoma polygonalis (Adams, 1852)

The Indo-Pacific Molluscan Database also includes the following species with names in current use

- Hemitoma arabica (Adams, 1852)
- Hemitoma modesta (Adams, 1872)
- Hemitoma subrugosa Thiele, 1916
- Hemitoma simpla Christiaens, 1987

Subgenus Montfortia, Récluz, 1843
accepted as the genus Montfortia Récluz, 1843

- Hemitoma cratitia (Adams, 1852)

Subgenus Montfortista, Iredale, 1929

- Hemitoma oldhamiana (Nevill, 1869)

Species brought into synonymy

- Hemitoma emarginata (Blainville, 1825): synonym of Montfortia emarginata (Blainville, 1825)
- Hemitoma excentrica (Iredale, 1929): synonym of Montfortista excentrica (Iredale, 1929)
- Hemitoma hermosa Lowe, 1935: synonym of Montfortia hermosa (Lowe, 1935)
- Hemitoma livescens (Reeve, 1865): synonym of Cellana livescens (Reeve, 1855)
- Hemitoma natlandi Durham, 1950: synonym of Octomarginula natlandi (Durham, 1950)
- Hemitoma panhi (Quoy & Gaimard, 1834): synonym of Montfortista panhi (Quoy & Gaimard, 1834)
- Hemitoma profunda (Deshayes, 1863): synonym of Eoacmaea profunda (Deshayes, 1863)
- Hemitoma rubida Verrill, 1850: synonym of Hemitoma octoradiata (Gmelin, 1791)
- Hemitoma subemarginata (Blainville, 1819): synonym of Montfortia subemarginata (Blainville, 1819)
- Hemitoma tricarinata (Born, 1778): synonym of Amathina tricarinata (Linnaeus, 1767)
