= E. arabica =

E. arabica may refer to:

- Emarginula arabica, a sea snail species
- Eremiaphila arabica, the Arabian mantis, an insect species native to the Middle East

== See also ==
- Arabica (disambiguation)
