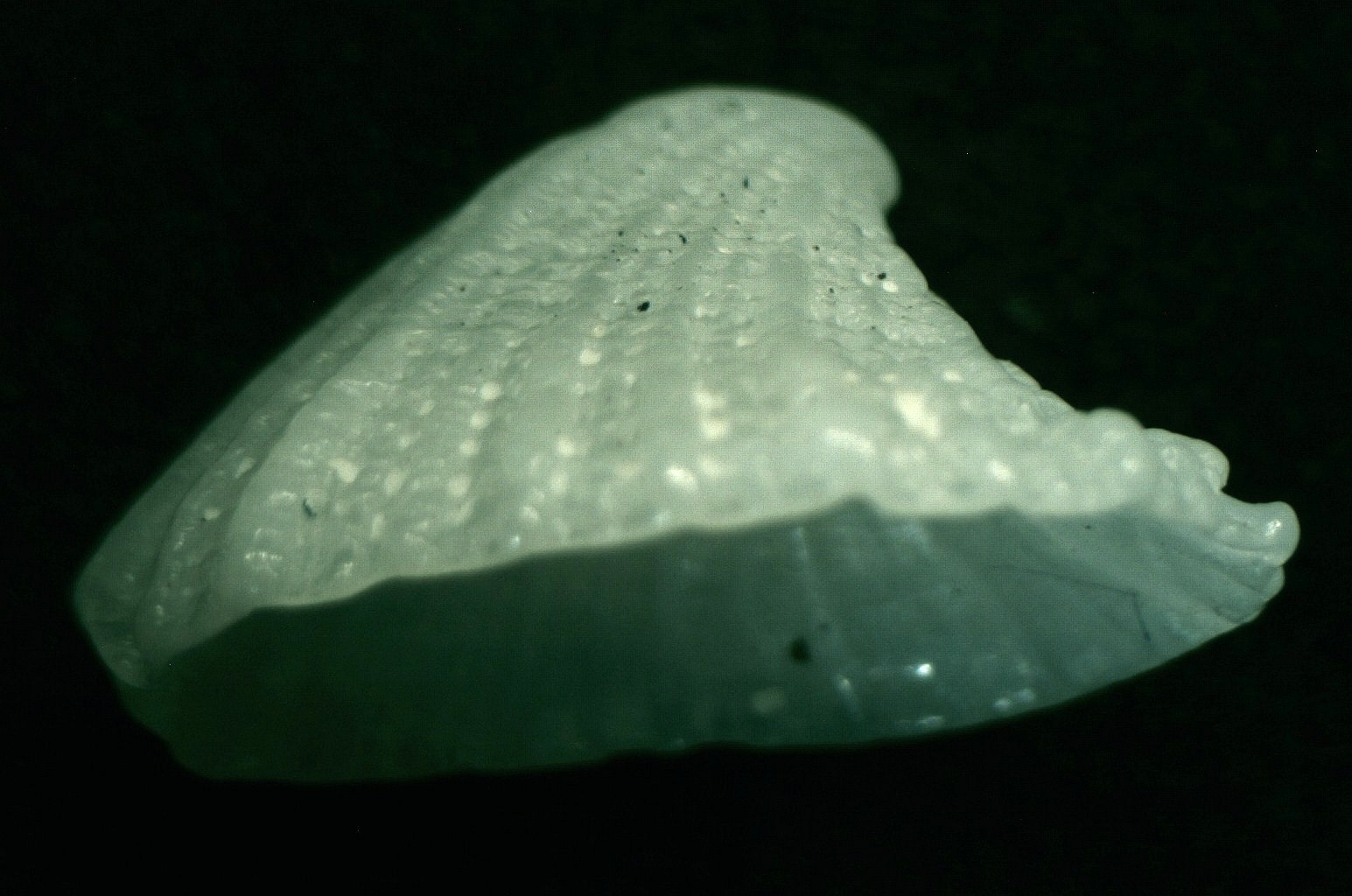
- A shell of Montfortia subemarginata

Scientific classification
- Kingdom: Animalia
- Phylum: Mollusca
- Class: Gastropoda
- Subclass: Vetigastropoda
- Order: Lepetellida
- Family: Fissurellidae
- Subfamily: Zeidorinae
- Genus: Montfortia; Récluz, 1843

Type species
- Emarginula australis Quoy & Gaimard 1834

Synonyms
- Hemitoma (Montfortia) Récluz, 1843

= Montfortia =

Genus of gastropods

Montfortia is a genus of sea snails, marine gastropod mollusks in the family Fissurellidae, the keyhole limpets and slit limpets.

== Species ==
Species within the genus Montfortia include:

- † Montfortia bikiniensis (Ladd, 1966)
- Montfortia emarginata (Blainville, 1825)
- Montfortia hermosa (Lowe, 1935)
- Montfortia picta (Dunker, 1860)
- Montfortia polygonalis (A. Adams, 1852)
- Montfortia pulchra (A. Adams, 1852)
- Montfortia subemarginata (Blainville, 1819)

The following species were brought into synonymy:

- Montfortia (Hemitoma) cumingii (G. B. Sowerby II, 1863): synonym of Hemitoma cumingii (G. B. Sowerby II, 1863)
- Montfortia excentrica Iredale, 1929: synonym of Montfortista excentrica (Iredale, 1929)
- Montfortia kirana Habe, 1963: synonym of Montfortista kirana (Habe, 1963)
- Montfortia panhi (Quoy & Gaimard, 1834): synonym of Montfortista panhi (Quoy & Gaimard, 1834)
