= M. arabica =

M. arabica may refer to:

- Medicago arabica, the spotted medick, spotted burclover, heart clover, a flowering plant species native to the Mediterranean basin
- Miomantis arabica, a praying mantis species

== Synonyms ==
- Mimosa arabica, a synonym for Acacia nilotica, the gum arabic tree, babul, Egyptian thorn or prickly acacia, a plant species native to Africa and the Indian subcontinent

== See also ==
- Arabica (disambiguation)
