= C. arabica =

C. arabica may refer to:

- Coffea arabica, a plant species originally indigenous to Yemen in the Arabian Peninsula and from the southwestern highlands of Ethiopia and southeastern Sudan
- Crocidura arabica, the Arabian shrew, a mammal species found in Oman and Yemen
- Cypraea arabica, the Arabian cowry, a sea snail species

== See also ==
- Arabica (disambiguation)
