= Octomarginula ostheimerae =

Scientific classification
- Kingdom: Animalia
- Phylum: Mollusca
- Class: Gastropoda
- Subclass: Vetigastropoda
- Order: Lepetellida
- Family: Fissurellidae
- Subfamily: Zeidorinae
- Genus: Octomarginula
- Species: O. ostheimerae

Binomial name
- Octomarginula ostheimerae (Abbott, 1958)

Synonyms
- Emarginula ostheimerae Abbott, 1958

Species of gastropod

Octomarginula ostheimerae is a species of small sea snail, a marine gastropod mollusk in the family Fissurellidae, the keyhole limpets and slit limpets.

This species was named by R. Tucker Abbott in 1958, in his publication on the marine mollusks of the island of Grand Cayman. But by 1974, in his book American Seashells, Abbott had decided that the shell was simply a juvenile of what is now called Montfortia emarginata. However, the species was re-instated by James McLean in a 2011 monograph on the subfamily Emarginulinae.
