= Montfortia picta =

Scientific classification
- Kingdom: Animalia
- Phylum: Mollusca
- Class: Gastropoda
- Subclass: Vetigastropoda
- Order: Lepetellida
- Family: Fissurellidae
- Subfamily: Zeidorinae
- Genus: Montfortia
- Species: M. picta

Binomial name
- Montfortia picta (Dunker, 1860)

Synonyms
- Emarginula picta Dunker, 1860; Montfortula picta (Dunker, 1860); Subemarginula cratitoides Yokoyama, 1926

Species of gastropod

Montfortia picta is a species of sea snail, a marine gastropod mollusk in the family Fissurellidae, the keyhole limpets and slit limpets.
