= Hemitoma polygonalis =

Scientific classification
- Kingdom: Animalia
- Phylum: Mollusca
- Class: Gastropoda
- Subclass: Vetigastropoda
- Order: Lepetellida
- Family: Fissurellidae
- Subfamily: Hemitominae
- Genus: Hemitoma
- Species: H. polygonalis

Binomial name
- Hemitoma polygonalis (Adams, 1852)

Synonyms
- Emarginula polygonalis Adams, 1852

Species of gastropod

Hemitoma polygonalis is a species of sea snail, a marine gastropod mollusk in the family Fissurellidae, the keyhole limpets and slit limpets.
