= Eremiaphila cycloptera =

Scientific classification
- Kingdom: Animalia
- Phylum: Arthropoda
- Clade: Pancrustacea
- Class: Insecta
- Order: Mantodea
- Family: Eremiaphilidae
- Genus: Eremiaphila
- Species: E. cycloptera

Binomial name
- Eremiaphila cycloptera Uvarov, 1939

Species of praying mantis

Eremiaphila cycloptera is a species of praying mantis native to Saudi Arabia.

== See also ==
- List of mantis genera and species
