= Hemitoma imbricata =

Scientific classification
- Kingdom: Animalia
- Phylum: Mollusca
- Class: Gastropoda
- Subclass: Vetigastropoda
- Order: Lepetellida
- Family: Fissurellidae
- Genus: Hemitoma
- Species: H. imbricata

Binomial name
- Hemitoma imbricata (Adams, 1851)

Synonyms
- Subemarginula imbricata Adams, 1851

Species of gastropod

Hemitoma imbricata is a species of sea snail, a marine gastropod mollusk in the family Fissurellidae, the keyhole limpets.
