= Eremiaphila yemenita =

Scientific classification
- Kingdom: Animalia
- Phylum: Arthropoda
- Clade: Pancrustacea
- Class: Insecta
- Order: Mantodea
- Family: Eremiaphilidae
- Genus: Eremiaphila
- Species: E. yemenita

Binomial name
- Eremiaphila yemenita Uvarov, 1939

Species of praying mantis

Eremiaphila yemenita is a species of praying mantis found in Yemen.

== See also ==
- List of mantis genera and species
