= Eremiaphila pierrei =

Scientific classification
- Kingdom: Animalia
- Phylum: Arthropoda
- Clade: Pancrustacea
- Class: Insecta
- Order: Mantodea
- Family: Eremiaphilidae
- Genus: Eremiaphila
- Species: E. pierrei

Binomial name
- Eremiaphila pierrei Chopard, 1954

Species of praying mantis

Eremiaphila pierrei, common name Pierre's mantis, is a species of praying mantis found in Algeria. It was described by Lucien Chopard in 1954.

== See also ==
- List of mantis genera and species
