= Eremiaphila kheychi =

Scientific classification
- Kingdom: Animalia
- Phylum: Arthropoda
- Clade: Pancrustacea
- Class: Insecta
- Order: Mantodea
- Family: Eremiaphilidae
- Genus: Eremiaphila
- Species: E. kheychi

Binomial name
- Eremiaphila kheychi Lefebvre, 1835

Species of praying mantis

Eremiaphila kheychi is a species of praying mantis in the family Eremiaphilidae that is found in Egypt.

== See also ==
- List of mantis genera and species
