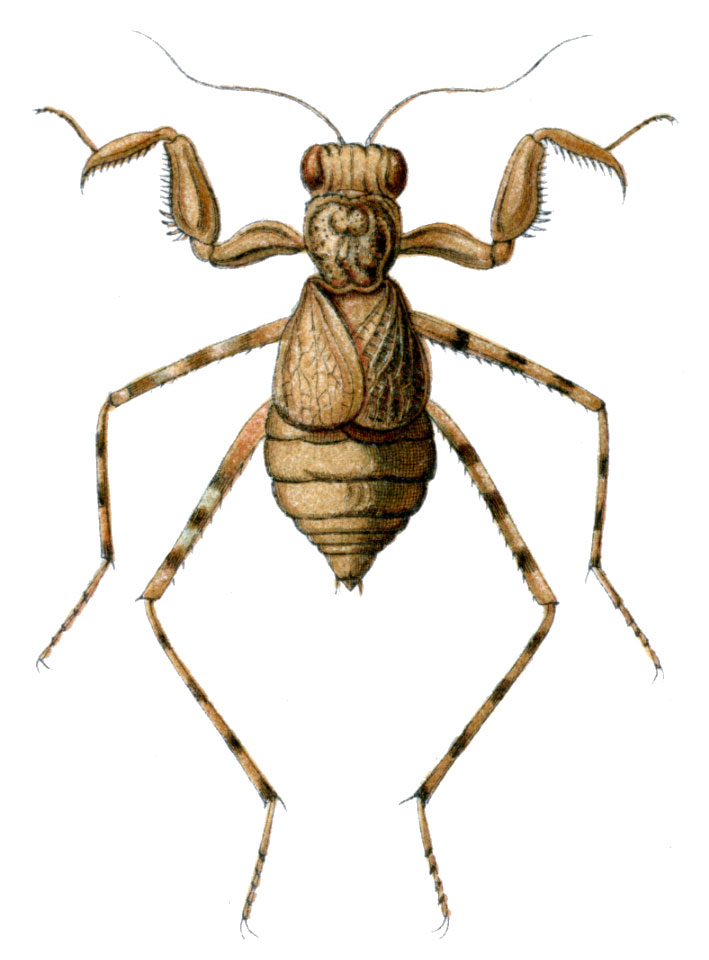
- Eremiaphila cerisyi

Scientific classification
- Kingdom: Animalia
- Phylum: Arthropoda
- Clade: Pancrustacea
- Class: Insecta
- Order: Mantodea
- Family: Eremiaphilidae
- Genus: Eremiaphila

Species
- Many, see text.

Synonyms
- Centromantis Werner, 1904; Eremophila Burmeister, 1838

= Eremiaphila =

Genus of mantis insects

Eremiaphila is a genus of mantises in the family Eremiaphilidae.

== Species ==
- Eremiaphila ammonita
- Eremiaphila andresi
- Eremiaphila anubis
- Eremiaphila arabica
- Eremiaphila aristidis
- Eremiaphila audouini
- Eremiaphila barbara
- Eremiaphila berndstiewi
- Eremiaphila bifasciata
- Eremiaphila bovei
- Eremiaphila braueri
- Eremiaphila brevipennis
- Eremiaphila brunneri (common desert mantis)
- Eremiaphila cairina
- Eremiaphila cerisyi
- Eremiaphila collenettei
- Eremiaphila cordofana
- Eremiaphila cycloptera
- Eremiaphila dagi
- Eremiaphila dentata
- Eremiaphila denticollis
- Eremiaphila foureaui
- Eremiaphila fraseri
- Eremiaphila genei
- Eremiaphila gigas
- Eremiaphila hebraica
- Eremiaphila heluanensis
- Eremiaphila irridipennis
- Eremiaphila khamsini
- Eremiaphila kheychi
- Eremiaphila klunzingeri
- Eremiaphila laeviceps
- Eremiaphila lefebvrii
- Eremiaphila luxor
- Eremiaphila maculipennis
- Eremiaphila monodi
- Eremiaphila moretii
- Eremiaphila murati
- Eremiaphila mzabi
- Eremiaphila nilotica
- Eremiaphila nova
- Eremiaphila numida
- Eremiaphila persica
- Eremiaphila petiti
- Eremiaphila pierrei
- Eremiaphila pyramidum
- Eremiaphila rectangulata
- Eremiaphila reticulata
- Eremiaphila rohlfsi
- Eremiaphila rotundipennis
- Eremiaphila rufipennis
- Eremiaphila rufula
- Eremiaphila savignyi
- Eremiaphila somalica
- Eremiaphila spinulosa
- Eremiaphila tuberculifera
- Eremiaphila turica
- Eremiaphila typhon
- Eremiaphila uvarovi
- Eremiaphila voltaensis
- Eremiaphila werneri
- Eremiaphila wettsteini
- Eremiaphila yemenita
- Eremiaphila zetterstedti (desert pebble mantis)

== See also ==
- List of mantis genera and species
