= Eremiaphila khamsini =

Scientific classification
- Kingdom: Animalia
- Phylum: Arthropoda
- Clade: Pancrustacea
- Class: Insecta
- Order: Mantodea
- Family: Eremiaphilidae
- Genus: Eremiaphila
- Species: E. khamsini

Binomial name
- Eremiaphila khamsini Lefebvre, 1835

Species of praying mantis

Eremiaphila khamsini is a species of praying mantis native to Egypt and Yemen.

== See also ==
- List of mantis genera and species
