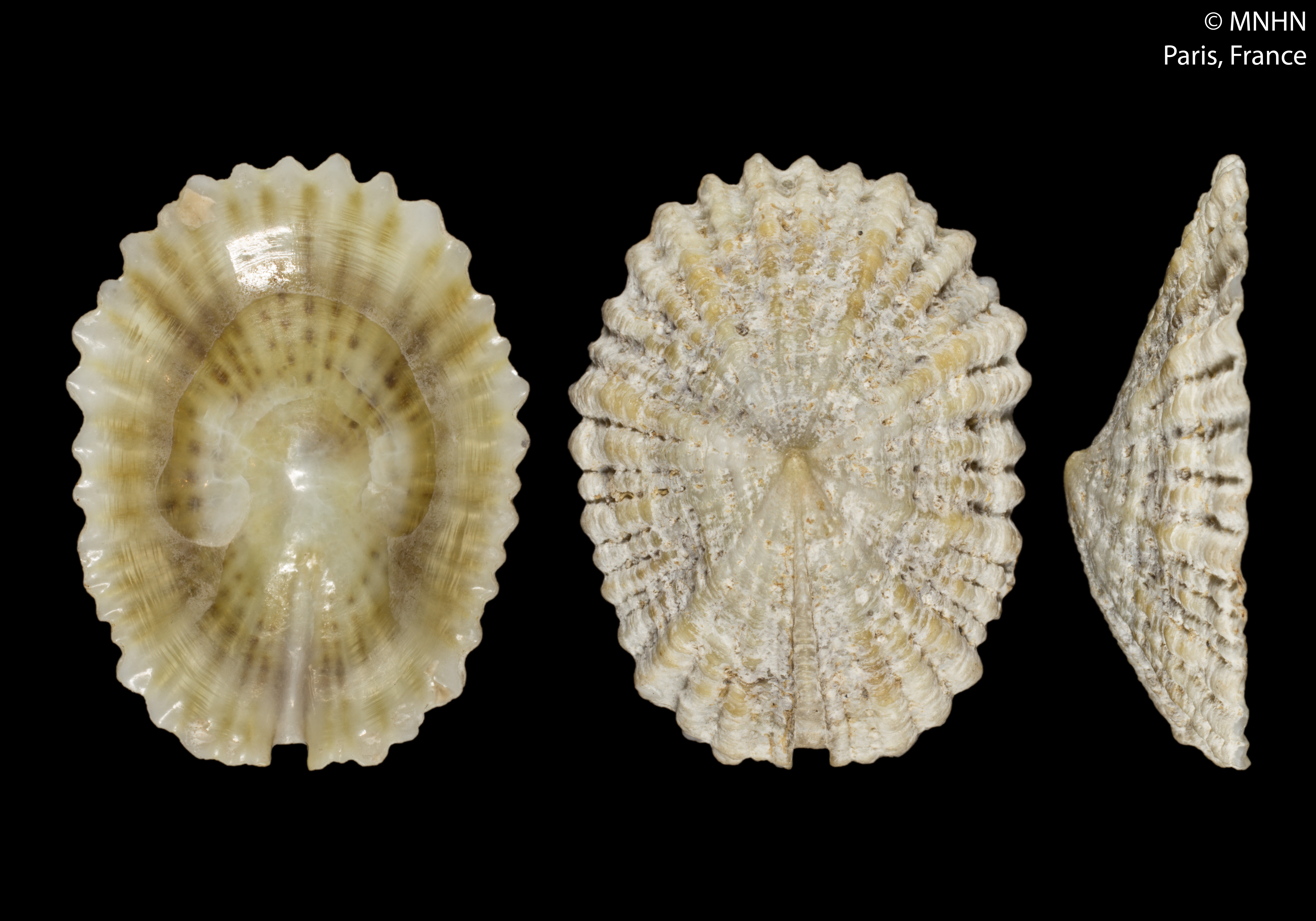

Scientific classification
- Kingdom: Animalia
- Phylum: Mollusca
- Class: Gastropoda
- Subclass: Vetigastropoda
- Order: Lepetellida
- Family: Fissurellidae
- Subfamily: Zeidorinae
- Genus: Octomarginula
- Species: O. scutellata

Binomial name
- Octomarginula scutellata (Deshayes, 1863)

Synonyms
- Emarginula scutellata Deshayes, 1863; Hemitoma scutellata (Deshayes, 1863)

= Octomarginula scutellata =

Species of gastropod

Octomarginula scutellata is a species of sea snail, a marine gastropod mollusk in the family Fissurellidae, the keyhole limpets and slit limpets.

== Distribution ==
This marine species occurs in the Indian Ocean off Réunion.
