= Eremiaphila pyramidum =

Scientific classification
- Kingdom: Animalia
- Phylum: Arthropoda
- Clade: Pancrustacea
- Class: Insecta
- Order: Mantodea
- Family: Eremiaphilidae
- Genus: Eremiaphila
- Species: E. pyramidum

Binomial name
- Eremiaphila pyramidum Werner, 1904

Species of praying mantis

Eremiaphila pyramidum is a species of praying mantis found in Egypt and Libya.

== See also ==
- List of mantis genera and species
