= Eremiaphila nilotica =

Scientific classification
- Kingdom: Animalia
- Phylum: Arthropoda
- Clade: Pancrustacea
- Class: Insecta
- Order: Mantodea
- Family: Eremiaphilidae
- Genus: Eremiaphila
- Species: E. nilotica

Binomial name
- Eremiaphila nilotica Saussure, 1871

Species of praying mantis

Eremiaphila nilotica is a species of praying mantis found in Egypt.

== See also ==
- List of mantis genera and species
