= Eremiaphila numida =

Scientific classification
- Domain: Eukaryota
- Kingdom: Animalia
- Phylum: Arthropoda
- Class: Insecta
- Order: Mantodea
- Family: Eremiaphilidae
- Genus: Eremiaphila
- Species: E. numida

Binomial name
- Eremiaphila numida Saussure, 1872

Species of praying mantis

Eremiaphila numida is a species of praying mantis in the family Eremiaphilidae.

== See also ==
- List of mantis genera and species
