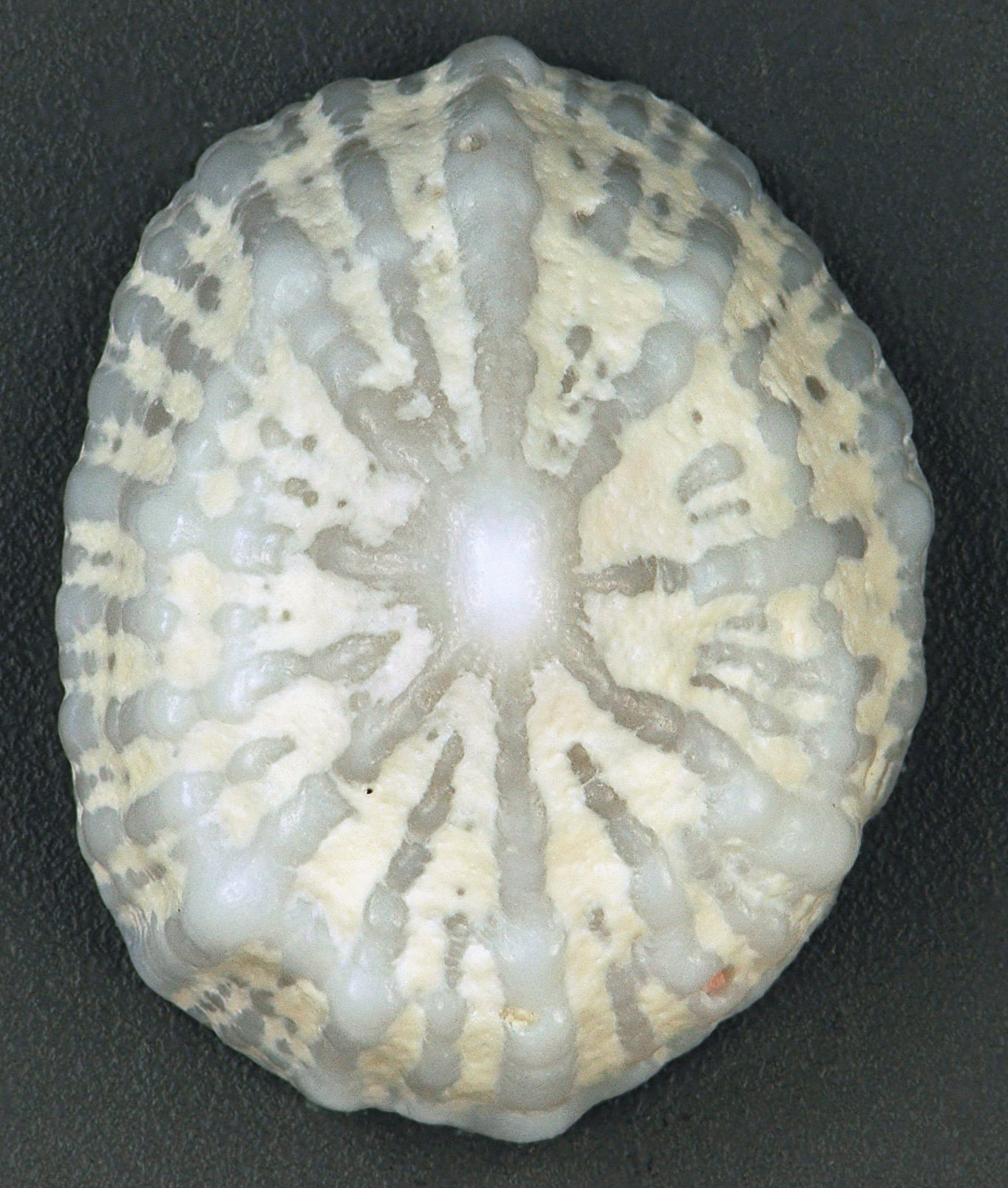
- Hemitoma octoradiata shell

Scientific classification
- Kingdom: Animalia
- Phylum: Mollusca
- Class: Gastropoda
- Subclass: Vetigastropoda
- Order: Lepetellida
- Family: Fissurellidae
- Genus: Hemitoma
- Species: H. octoradiata

Binomial name
- Hemitoma octoradiata (Gmelin, 1791)

Synonyms
- Patella notata auct. non Linnaeus, 1758; Subemarginula octoradiata Gmelin, 1791; Patella octoradiata Gmelin, 1791; Emarginula tricostata Sowerby I, 1823; Emarginula depressa auct. non Blainville, 1824; Emarginula listeri Anton, 1838; Emarginula clausa d'Orbigny, 1847; Emarginula guadaloupensis Sowerby II, 1863; Patella confusa Krebs, 1864; Emarginula octocostata Mörch, 1878; Emarginula tensa Guppy, 1895; Hemitoma rubida Verrill, 1950

= Hemitoma octoradiata =

Species of gastropod

Hemitoma octoradiata is a species of sea snail, a marine gastropod mollusk in the family Fissurellidae, the keyhole limpets.
