= Eremiaphila ammonita =

Scientific classification
- Domain: Eukaryota
- Kingdom: Animalia
- Phylum: Arthropoda
- Class: Insecta
- Order: Mantodea
- Family: Eremiaphilidae
- Genus: Eremiaphila
- Species: E. ammonita

Binomial name
- Eremiaphila ammonita Uvarov, 1933

Species of praying mantis

Eremiaphila ammonita is a species of praying mantis native to Jordan.

== See also ==
- List of mantis genera and species
