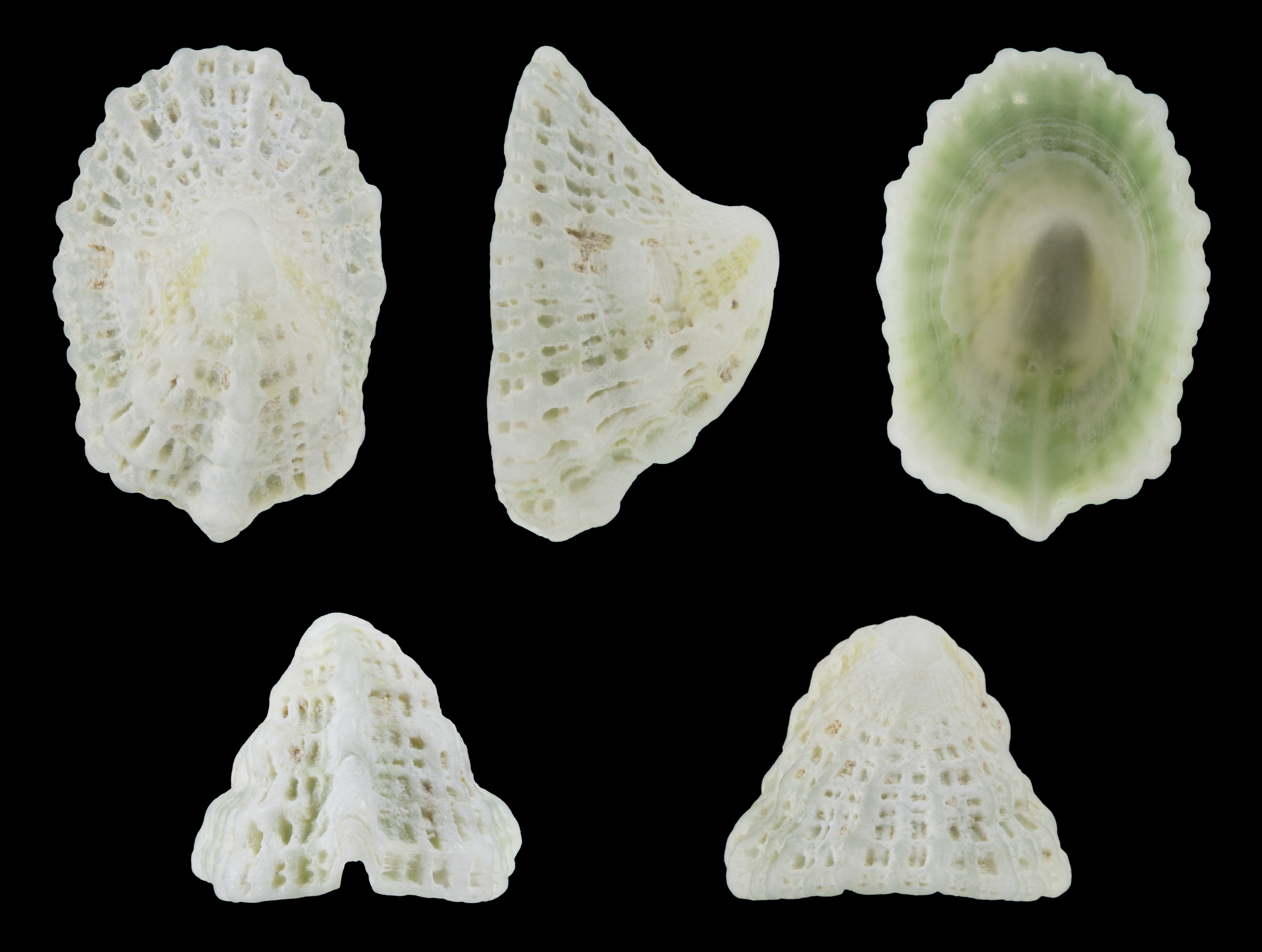
- Shell of Montfortista panhi (Quoy & Gaimard, 1834)

Scientific classification
- Kingdom: Animalia
- Phylum: Mollusca
- Class: Gastropoda
- Subclass: Vetigastropoda
- Order: Lepetellida
- Superfamily: Fissurelloidea
- Family: Fissurellidae
- Subfamily: Zeidorinae
- Genus: Montfortista; Iredale, 1929

Type species
- Montfortia excentrica Iredale, 1929

Synonyms
- Siphonella Issel, 1869

= Montfortista =

Genus of gastropods

Montfortista is a genus of sea snails, marine gastropod mollusks in the family Fissurellidae, the keyhole limpets and slit limpets.

== Species ==
Species within the genus Montfortista include:

- Montfortista excentrica (Iredale, 1929)
- Montfortista kirana (Habe, 1963)
- Montfortista oldhamiana ((G. Nevill & H. Nevill, 1869)
- Montfortista panhi (Quoy & Gaimard, 1834)
