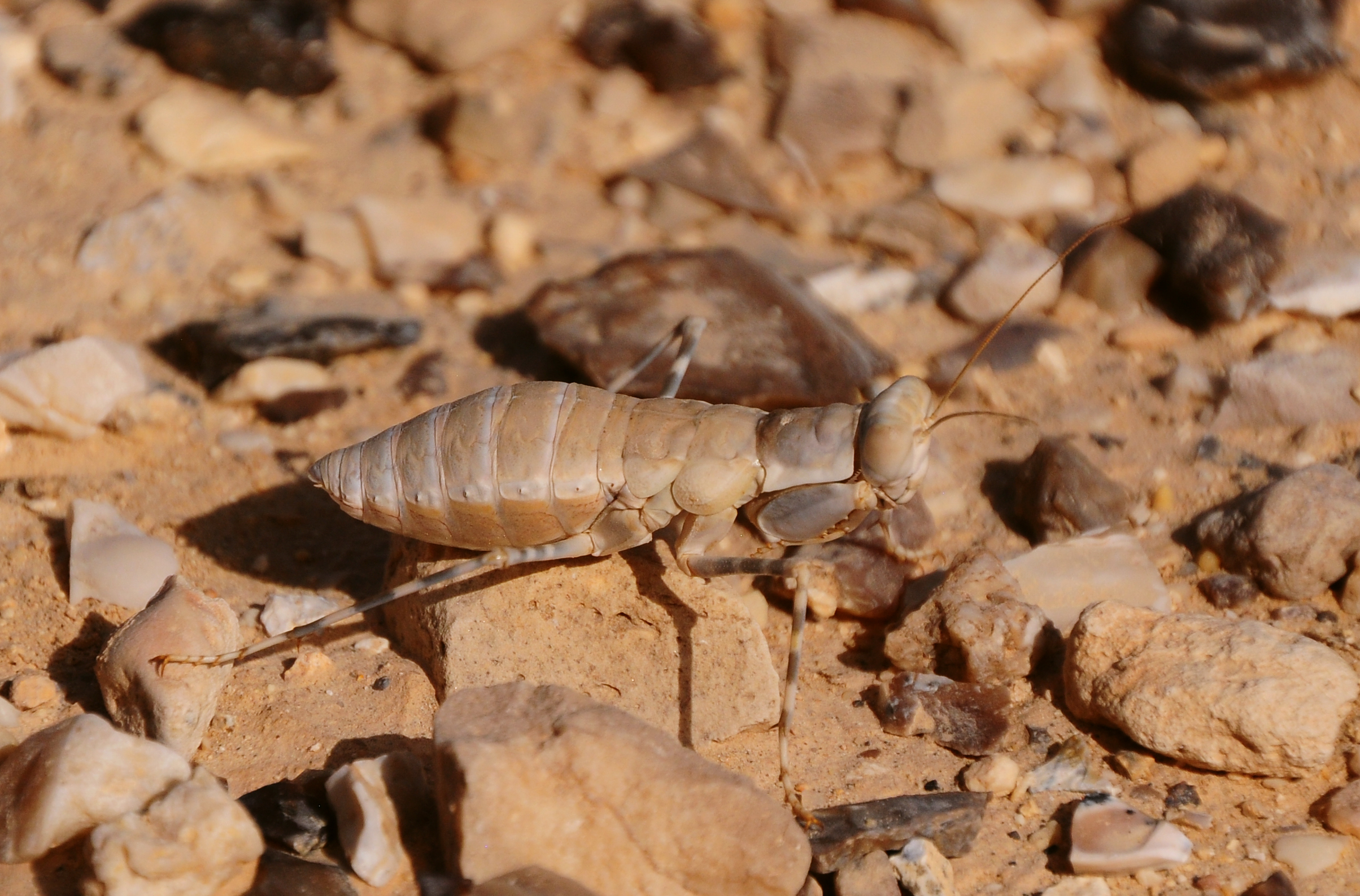

Scientific classification
- Kingdom: Animalia
- Phylum: Arthropoda
- Clade: Pancrustacea
- Class: Insecta
- Order: Mantodea
- Family: Eremiaphilidae
- Genus: Eremiaphila
- Species: E. brunneri

Binomial name
- Eremiaphila brunneri Werner, 1905

Synonyms
- Eremiaphila hauensteini Werner, 1905; Eremiaphila sacra Giglio-Tos, 1916

= Eremiaphila brunneri =

Species of praying mantis

Eremiaphila brunneri is a species of praying mantis in the family Eremiaphilidae. They are located in and around Israel.

== See also ==
- List of mantis genera and species
