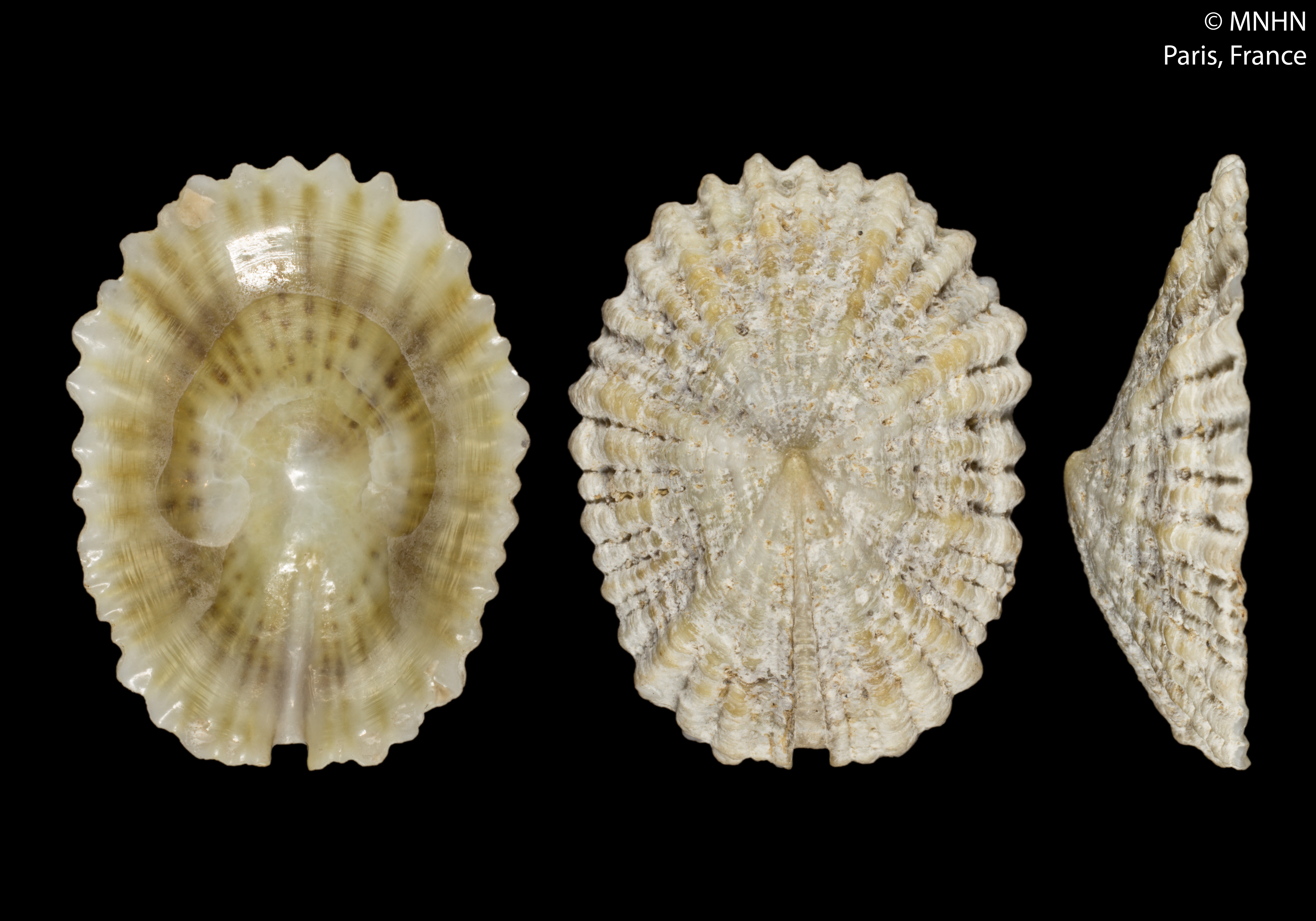
- Shell of Octomarginula scutellata (lectotype at MNHN, Paris)

Scientific classification
- Kingdom: Animalia
- Phylum: Mollusca
- Class: Gastropoda
- Subclass: Vetigastropoda
- Order: Lepetellida
- Family: Fissurellidae
- Subfamily: Zeidorinae
- Genus: Octomarginula; McLean, 2011

Type species
- Emarginula ostheimerae Abbott, 1958

Species
- See text

= Octomarginula =

Genus of gastropods

Octomarginula is a genus of sea snails or limpets, marine gastropod mollusks in the family Fissurellidae, the keyhole limpets and slit limpets.

== Species ==
Species within the genus Octomarginula include:

- Octomarginula arabica (Adams, 1852)
- Octomarginula natlandi (Durham, 1950)
- Octomarginula nodulosa (A. Adams, 1852)
- Octomarginula ostheimerae (Abbott, 1958)
- Octomarginula sculptilis (A. Adams, 1852)
- Octomarginula scutellata (Deshayes, 1863)
