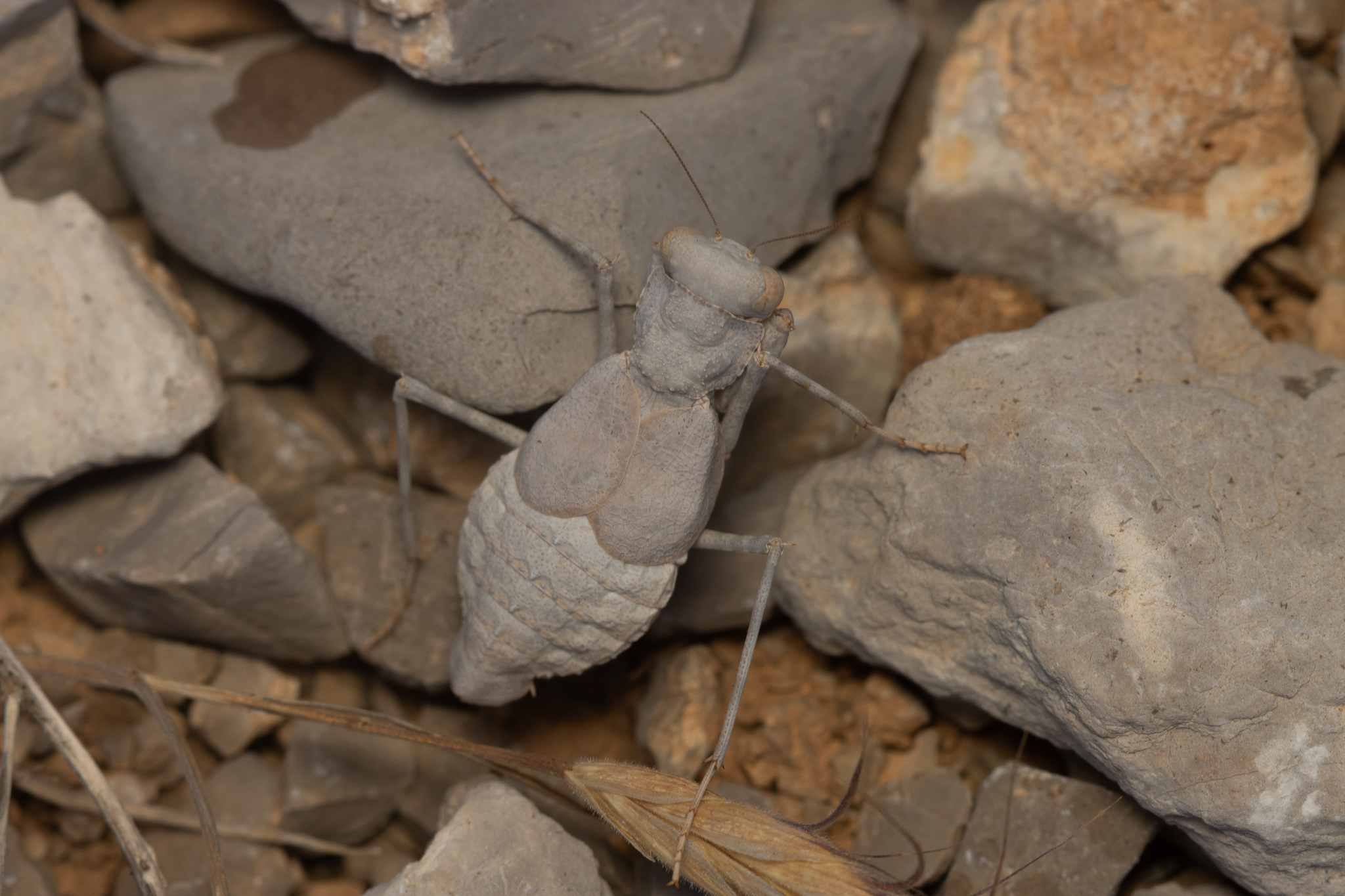
- Eremiaphila genei adult female, Israel

Scientific classification
- Kingdom: Animalia
- Phylum: Arthropoda
- Clade: Pancrustacea
- Class: Insecta
- Order: Mantodea
- Family: Eremiaphilidae
- Genus: Eremiaphila
- Species: E. genei

Binomial name
- Eremiaphila genei Lefebvre, 1835

Synonyms
- Eremiaphila burmeisteri Saussure, 1871; Eremiaphila laevipennis Werner, 1905

= Eremiaphila genei =

Species of praying mantis

Eremiaphila genei is a species of praying mantis in the family Eremiaphilidae.

== See also ==
- List of mantis genera and species
