= Eremiaphila typhon =

Scientific classification
- Kingdom: Animalia
- Phylum: Arthropoda
- Clade: Pancrustacea
- Class: Insecta
- Order: Mantodea
- Family: Eremiaphilidae
- Genus: Eremiaphila
- Species: E. typhon

Binomial name
- Eremiaphila typhon Lefebvre, 1835

Synonyms
- Eremiaphila ehrenbergi Burmeister, 1838

Species of praying mantis

Eremiaphila typhon is a species of praying mantis, native to Africa and Asia.

It is one of the most far-ranging species within its genus and has been found in Egypt, Algeria, Saudi Arabia, India, Libya, Niger, Syria, and Chad.

== See also ==
- List of mantis genera and species
