= Eremiaphila foureaui =

Scientific classification
- Domain: Eukaryota
- Kingdom: Animalia
- Phylum: Arthropoda
- Class: Insecta
- Order: Mantodea
- Family: Eremiaphilidae
- Genus: Eremiaphila
- Species: E. foureaui

Binomial name
- Eremiaphila foureaui Bolivar, 1905

Species of insect

Eremiaphila foureaui is a species of praying mantis in the family Eremiaphilidae.

== See also ==
- List of mantis genera and species
