= Eremiaphila zetterstedti =

Scientific classification
- Kingdom: Animalia
- Phylum: Arthropoda
- Clade: Pancrustacea
- Class: Insecta
- Order: Mantodea
- Family: Eremiaphilidae
- Genus: Eremiaphila
- Species: E. zetterstedti

Binomial name
- Eremiaphila zetterstedti Beier, 1942

Species of praying mantis

Eremiaphila zetterstedti, common name desert pebble mantis, is a species of praying mantis found in Africa.

== See also ==
- List of mantis genera and species
