= Eremiaphila persica =

Scientific classification
- Domain: Eukaryota
- Kingdom: Animalia
- Phylum: Arthropoda
- Class: Insecta
- Order: Mantodea
- Family: Eremiaphilidae
- Genus: Eremiaphila
- Species: E. persica

Binomial name
- Eremiaphila persica Werner, 1905

Species of praying mantis

Eremiaphila persica is a species of praying mantis found in Turkey, Iran, and Azerbaijan.

== See also ==
- List of mantis genera and species
