= Eremiaphila nova =

Scientific classification
- Kingdom: Animalia
- Phylum: Arthropoda
- Class: Insecta
- Order: Mantodea
- Family: Eremiaphilidae
- Genus: Eremiaphila
- Species: E. nova

Binomial name
- Eremiaphila nova Giglio-Tos, 1916

Species of praying mantis

Eremiaphila nova is a species of praying mantis in the family Eremiaphilidae.

== See also ==
- List of mantis genera and species
