= % Arabica =

Hong Kong coffeehouse chain

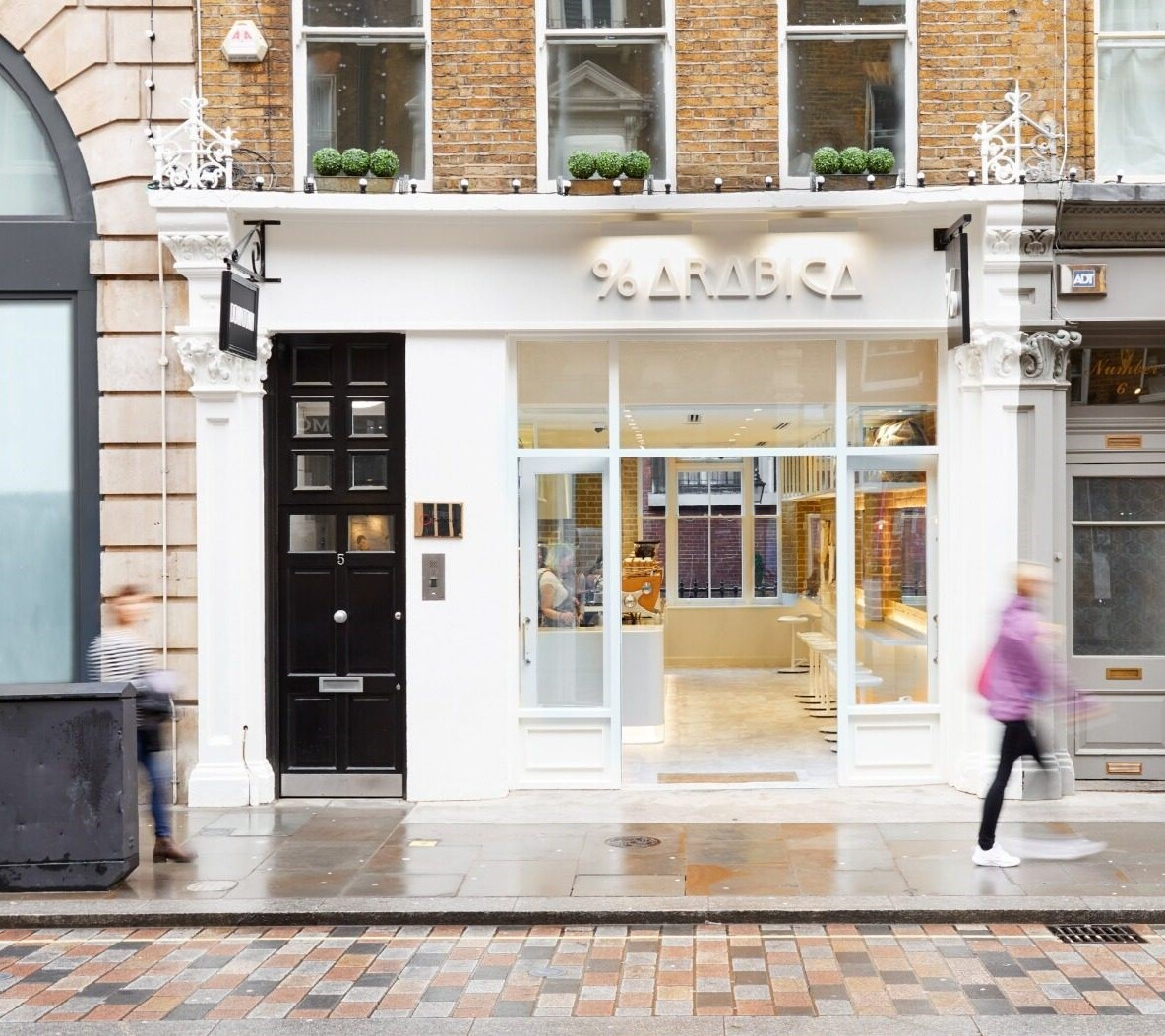
- Covent Garden, London location
- Type: Ltd.
- Industry: Coffee industry
- Founded: 2013
- Founder: Kenneth Shoji <VR>
- Headquarters: Kyoto, Japan (2019~); Discovery Bay, Hong Kong (2013–2019)
- Website: arabica.com

% Arabica, also known as % ΔRΔBICΔ, is an international Japanese specialty coffee chain brand based in Hong Kong.

The company's international flagship and headquarters are located in Kyoto. Its first location opened in Hong Kong in 2013 and, as of June 2025, has grown to 253 locations globally.

== Company history ==
The coffee brand was founded by Kenneth Shoji. After the Tōhoku earthquake destroyed his house in Fukushima Prefecture in 2011, he moved to Hong Kong. After moving, he decided to start a coffee business so he traveled to Hawaii and purchased a coffee farm. In 2013, Shoji opened the first % Arabica café in Hong Kong. In 2014, the worldwide flagship store in the Kyoto's historic Higashiyama district was opened. The store's location also serves as the company's global headquarters location.

% Arabica was described as "Japan's cult-favorite hit coffee shop" by Eater.

In 2022, during The London Coffee Festival, % Arabica won the "Most Notable New Cafe" award in the UK Coffee Awards 2022.

The coffee brand is known for using its custom-made espresso machines, manufactured in Seattle, that provide baristas with more control while creating craft drinks.

== Coffee shop aesthetic ==
% Arabica's stores focus on having a clean, minimalist style fitting the Japanese design principles of simple beauty while having local design elements inspired by the countries in which they are based. Founder Kenneth has collaborated with several architects and design studios such as B.L.U.E. Architecture, ciguë, Nendo, Precht, and Puddle.

== International growth ==
As of August 2025, the chain has 253 stores worldwide. Countries served include the United States, Canada, Indonesia, Qatar, China (including Macau), the United Kingdom, Bahrain, Malaysia, Morocco, Hungary, Kuwait, United Arab Emirates, Japan, France, Hong Kong, Cambodia, Philippines, Thailand, Oman and Taiwan. % Arabica's largest international presence is in mainland China, where it operates 88 stores.

% Arabica expanded to Thailand in June 2020, opening a 250m^{2} store in Bangkok's Iconsiam center which was described as the city's most popular specialty coffee cafe. At the time, it was the brand's 48th global outpost.

The first U.S. cafe opened in Dumbo, Brooklyn on June 11, 2021. Most locations of % Arabica are franchise operations, however, the three locations in Kyoto are corporate managed.

In August 2022, % Arabica opened its first store in Taiwan located at the foot of Taipei Elephant Mountain and the first Bali store at Kuta Beachwalk Mall. It is the first % Arabica store to forgo the usage of plastic cups, a standard that all % Arabica stores to follow in the future. The stores were quickly followed by the first location in South Korea, opening in Seoul's Gangnam district in September 2022. The store marked % Arabica's 113th global location.

== Gallery ==
% Arabica Store locations
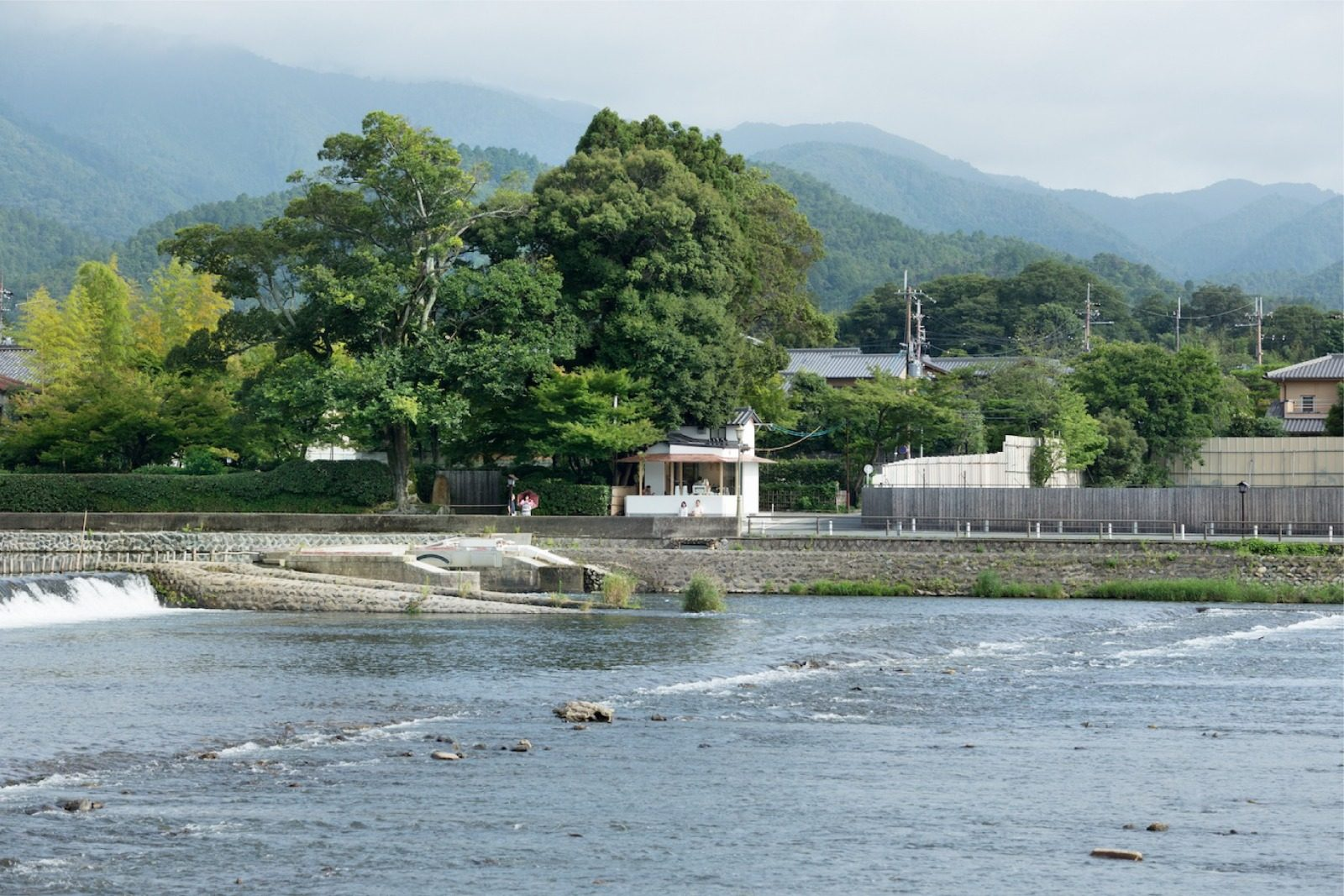
% Arabica Kyoto Arashiyama

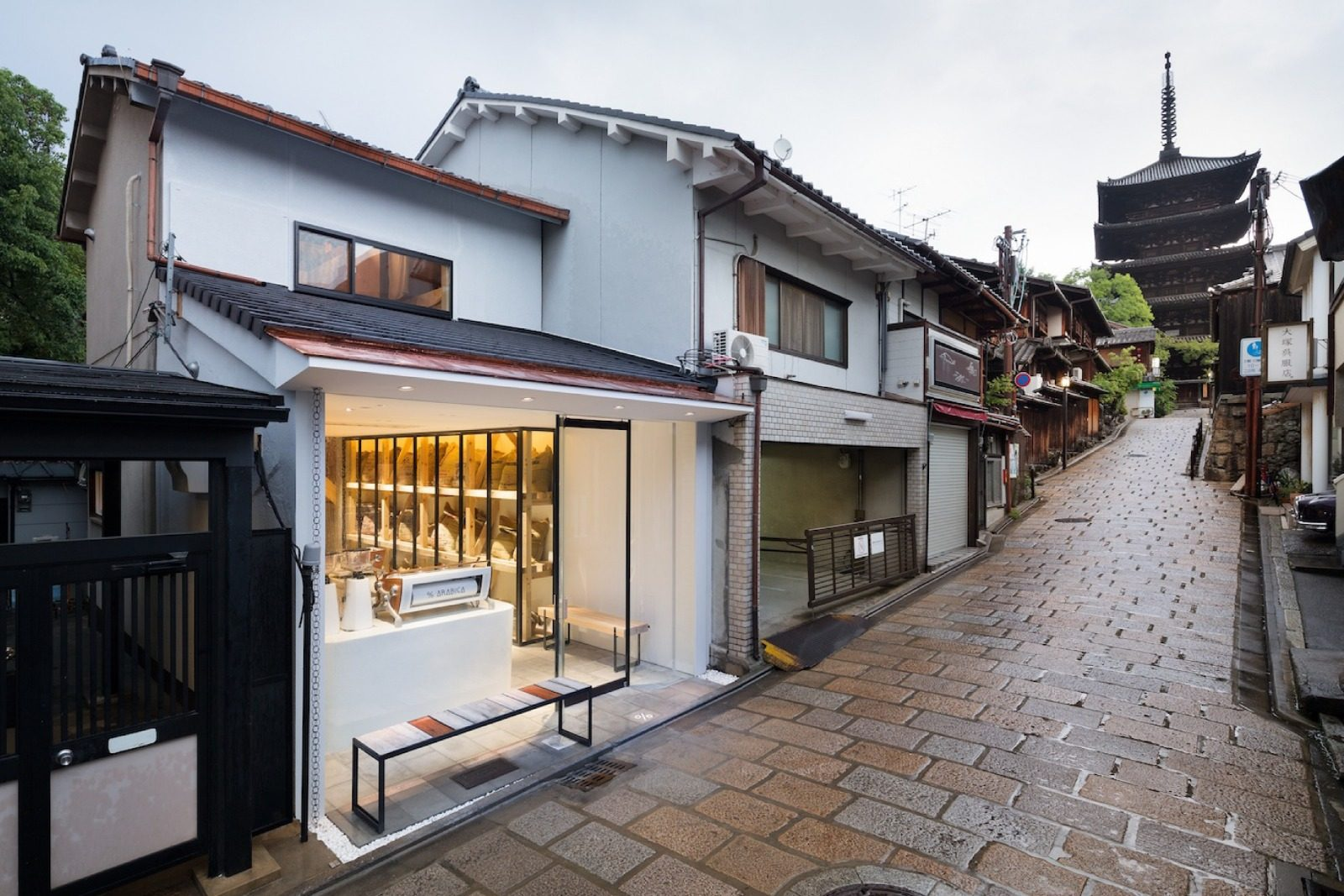
% Arabica Kyoto Higashiyama

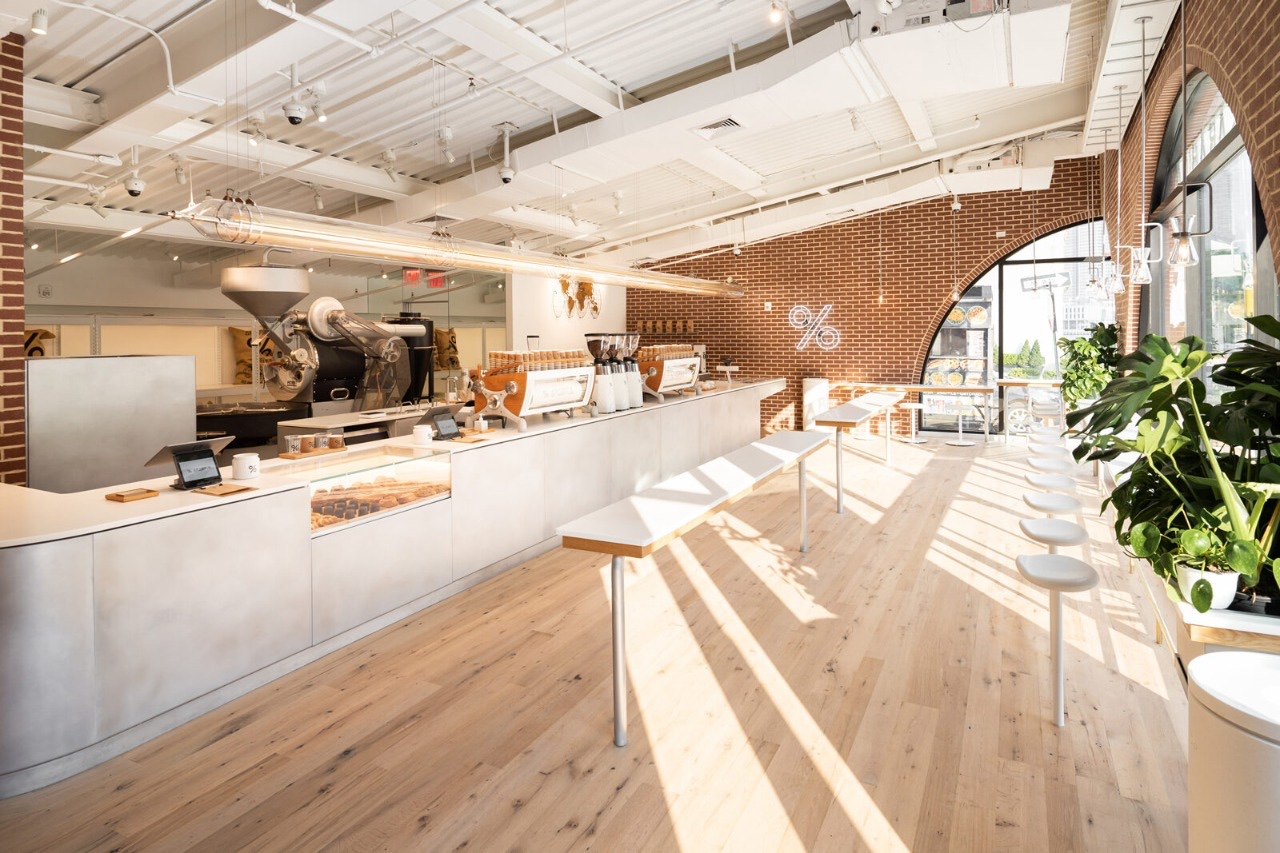
% Arabica New York Dumbo Roastery

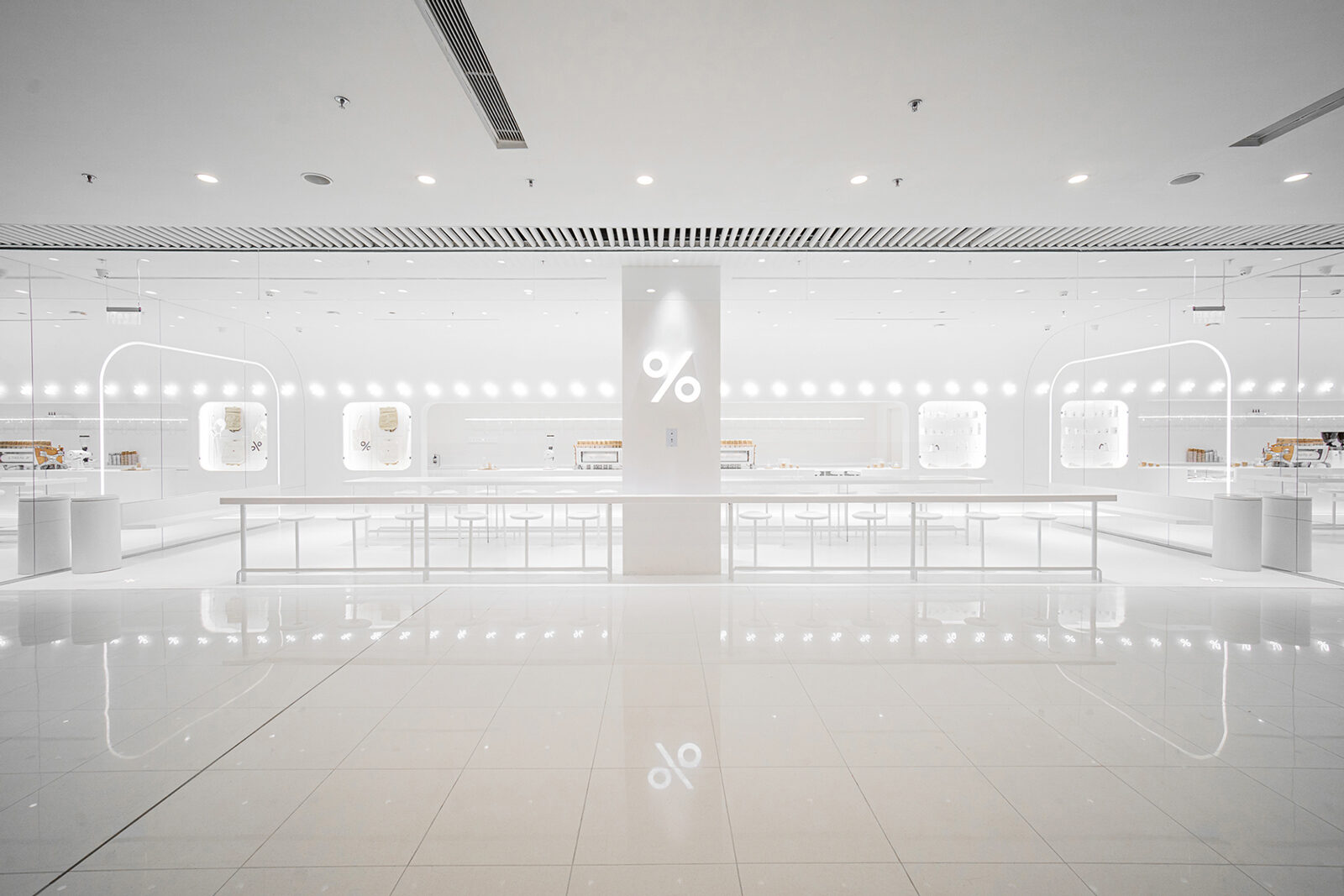
% Arabica Wuxi Central 66

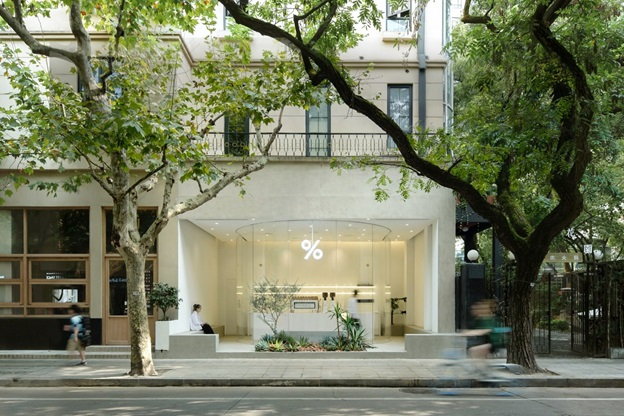
% Arabica Shanghai West Jianguo Road

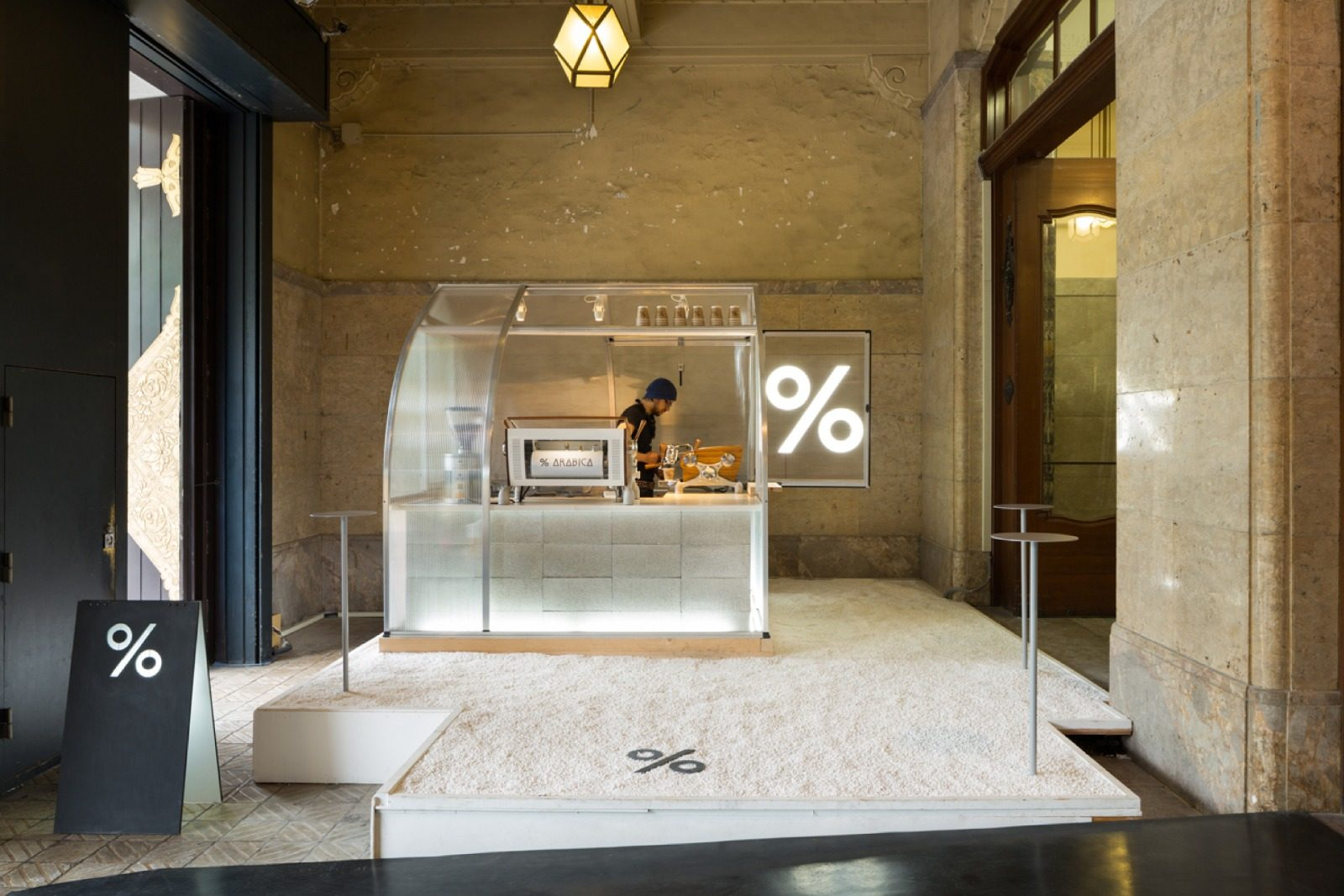
% Arabica Kyoto Parasophia

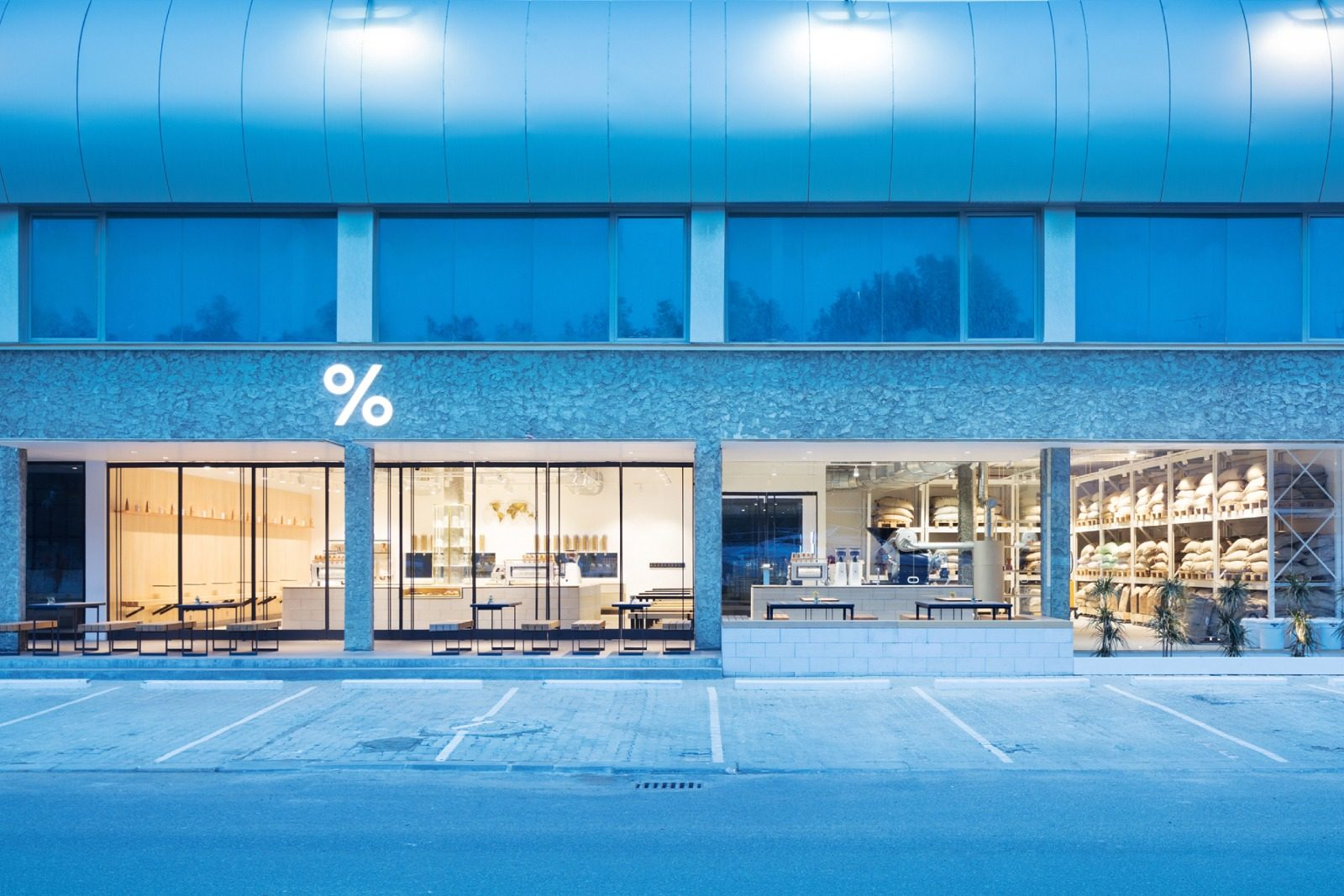
% Arabica Kuwait Roastery

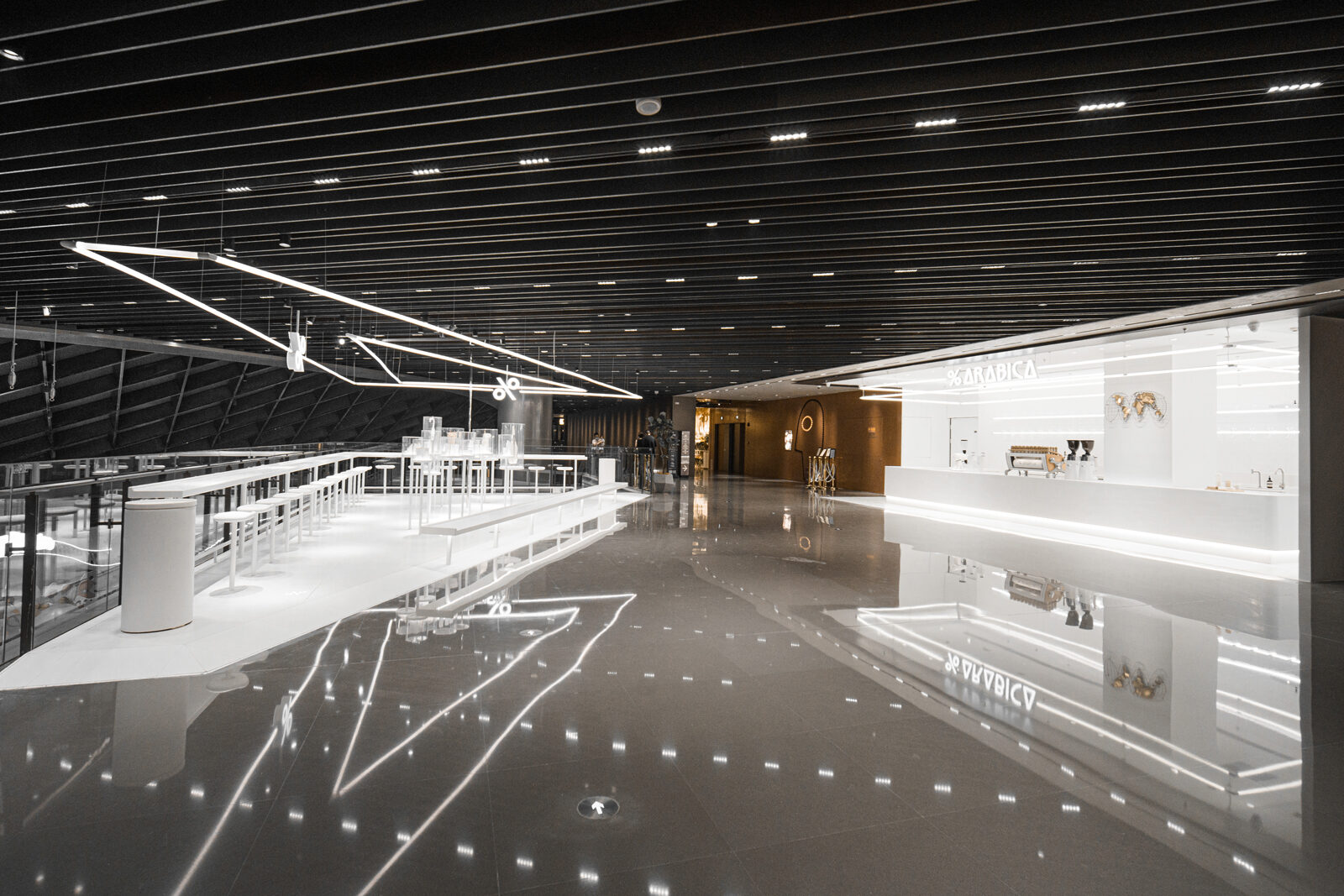
% Arabica Beijing The New Mall

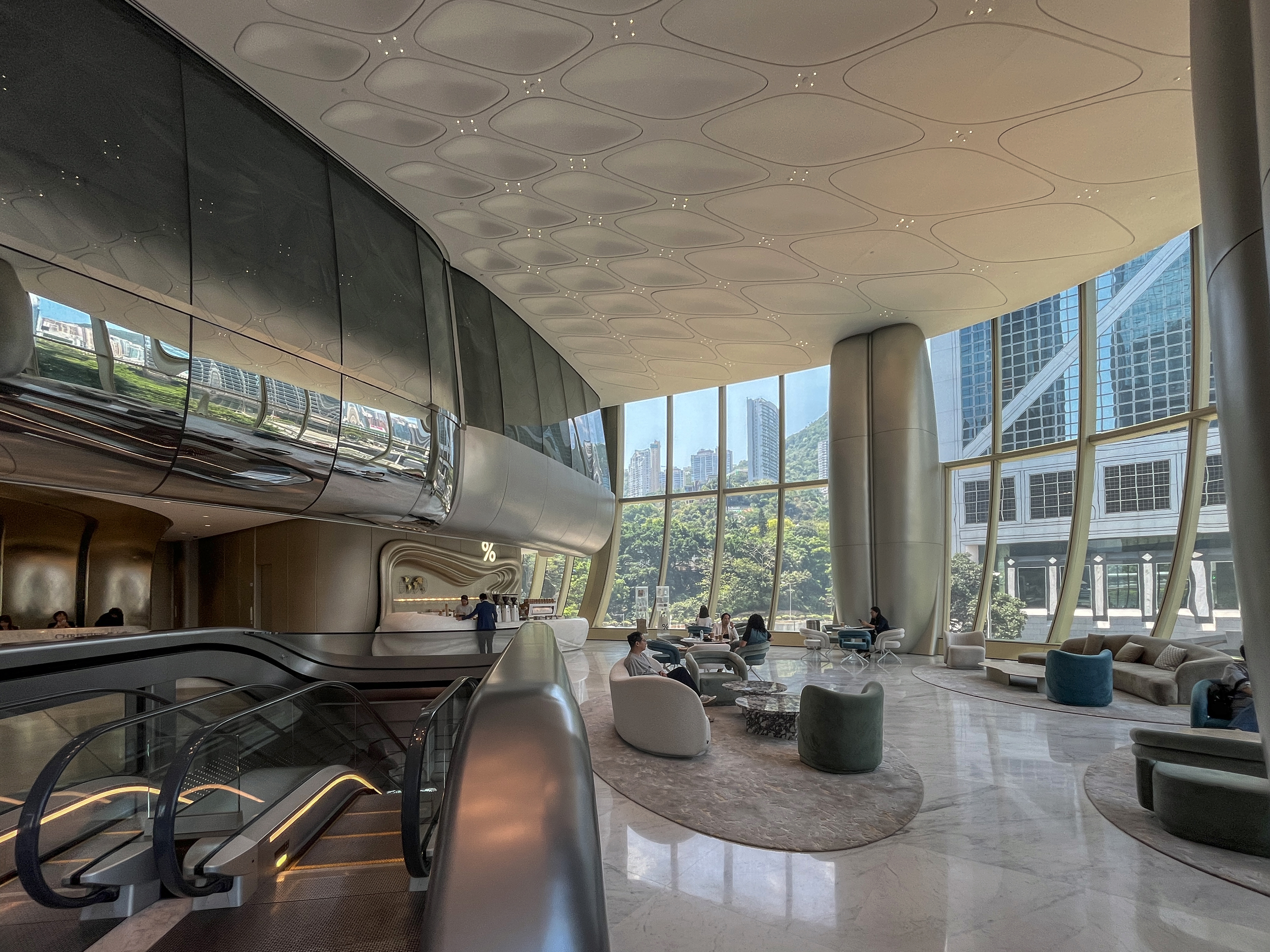
% Arabica in Hong Kong The Henderson

== See also ==
- List of coffeehouse chains
