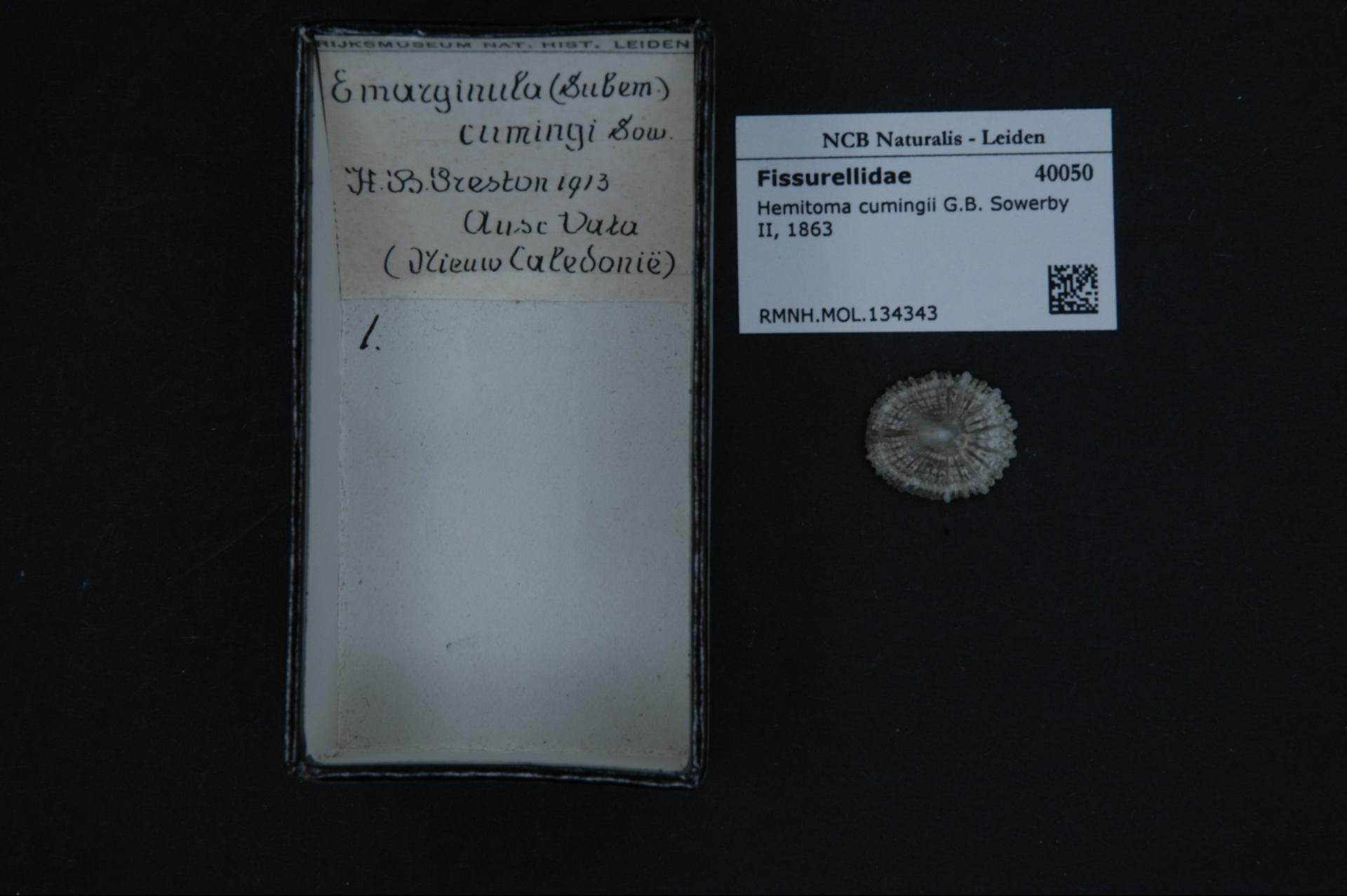

Scientific classification
- Kingdom: Animalia
- Phylum: Mollusca
- Class: Gastropoda
- Subclass: Vetigastropoda
- Order: Lepetellida
- Family: Fissurellidae
- Genus: Hemitoma
- Species: H. cumingii

Binomial name
- Hemitoma cumingii Récluz, 1863

Synonyms
- Emarginella cumingii Récluz, 1863

= Hemitoma cumingii =

Species of gastropod

Hemitoma cumingii is a species of sea snail, a marine gastropod mollusk in the family Fissurellidae, the keyhole limpets.
