= Octomarginula arabica =

Scientific classification
- Kingdom: Animalia
- Phylum: Mollusca
- Class: Gastropoda
- Subclass: Vetigastropoda
- Order: Lepetellida
- Family: Fissurellidae
- Genus: Octomarginula
- Species: O. arabica

Binomial name
- Octomarginula arabica Adams, 1852

Synonyms
- Emarginula arabica Adams, 1852 (original combination)

Species of gastropod

Octomarginula arabica is a species of sea snail or limpet, a marine gastropod mollusk in the family Fissurellidae, the keyhole limpets and slit limpets.
