= Octomarginula natlandi =

Scientific classification
- Kingdom: Animalia
- Phylum: Mollusca
- Class: Gastropoda
- Subclass: Vetigastropoda
- Order: Lepetellida
- Family: Fissurellidae
- Subfamily: Zeidorinae
- Genus: Octomarginula
- Species: O. natlandi

Binomial name
- Octomarginula natlandi (Durham, 1950)

Synonyms
- Hemitoma natlandi Durham, 1950

Species of gastropod

Octomarginula natlandi is a species of sea snail, a marine gastropod mollusk in the family Fissurellidae, the keyhole limpets and slit limpets.
