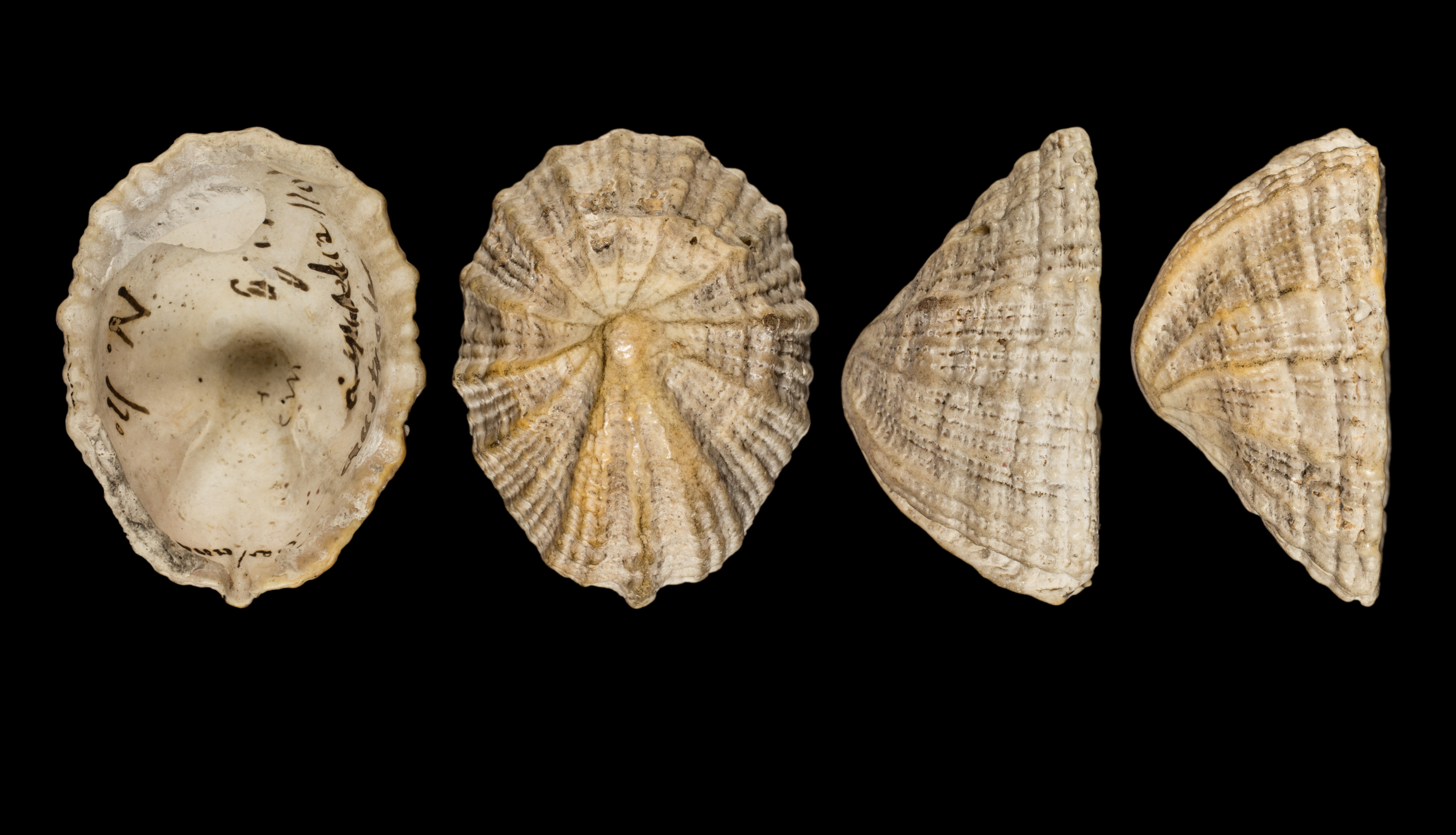
- A shell of Montfortia subemarginata (syntype at MNHN, Paris)

Scientific classification
- Kingdom: Animalia
- Phylum: Mollusca
- Class: Gastropoda
- Subclass: Vetigastropoda
- Order: Lepetellida
- Family: Fissurellidae
- Subfamily: Zeidorinae
- Genus: Montfortia
- Species: M. subemarginata

Binomial name
- Montfortia subemarginata (Blainville, 1819)

Synonyms
- Emarginula australis Quoy & Gaimard, 1834; Emarginula subemarginata Blainville, 1819; Hemitoma (Montfortia) australis Quoy & Gaimard, 1834

= Montfortia subemarginata =

Species of gastropod

Montfortia subemarginata, common name the emarginate limpet, is a species of sea snail, a marine gastropod mollusk in the family Fissurellidae, the keyhole limpets and slit limpets.

== Description ==
The size of the shell varies between 11 mm and 40 mm.

== Distribution ==
This marine species occurs off Victoria, Australia and off Tasmania.
