= Montfortia hermosa =

Scientific classification
- Kingdom: Animalia
- Phylum: Mollusca
- Class: Gastropoda
- Subclass: Vetigastropoda
- Order: Lepetellida
- Family: Fissurellidae
- Subfamily: Zeidorinae
- Genus: Montfortia
- Species: M. hermosa

Binomial name
- Montfortia hermosa (Lowe, 1935)

Synonyms
- Hemitoma (Montfortia) hermosa Lowe, 1935; Hemitoma hermosa Lowe, 1935

Species of gastropod

Montfortia hermosa is a species of sea snail, a marine gastropod mollusk in the family Fissurellidae, the keyhole limpets and slit limpets.

== Description ==
This shell of this mollusk species grows to a size of 7 millimeters.

== Distribution ==
This marine species of mollusk occurs in the waters of Gulf of California, Mexico.
