= Eremiaphila arabica =

Scientific classification
- Kingdom: Animalia
- Phylum: Arthropoda
- Clade: Pancrustacea
- Class: Insecta
- Order: Mantodea
- Family: Eremiaphilidae
- Genus: Eremiaphila
- Species: E. arabica

Binomial name
- Eremiaphila arabica Saussure, 1871

Synonyms
- Eremiaphila dawydowi Werner, 1905

Species of praying mantis

Eremiaphila arabica, common name Arabian mantis, is a species of praying mantis native to the Middle East and has been found in Egypt, Bahrain, Yemen, and Saudi Arabia.

== See also ==
- List of mantis genera and species
