= Montfortista kirana =

Scientific classification
- Kingdom: Animalia
- Phylum: Mollusca
- Class: Gastropoda
- Subclass: Vetigastropoda
- Order: Lepetellida
- Family: Fissurellidae
- Subfamily: Zeidorinae
- Genus: Montfortista
- Species: M. kirana

Binomial name
- Montfortista kirana (Habe, 1963)

Synonyms
- Hemitoma kirana Habe, 1963; Montfortia kirana Habe, 1963

Species of gastropod

Montfortista kirana is a species of sea snail, a marine gastropod mollusk in the family Fissurellidae, the keyhole limpets and slit limpets.

== Description ==
The length of the shell varies between 4.5 mm and 12 mm.

== Distribution ==
This marine species occurs off the Philippines.
