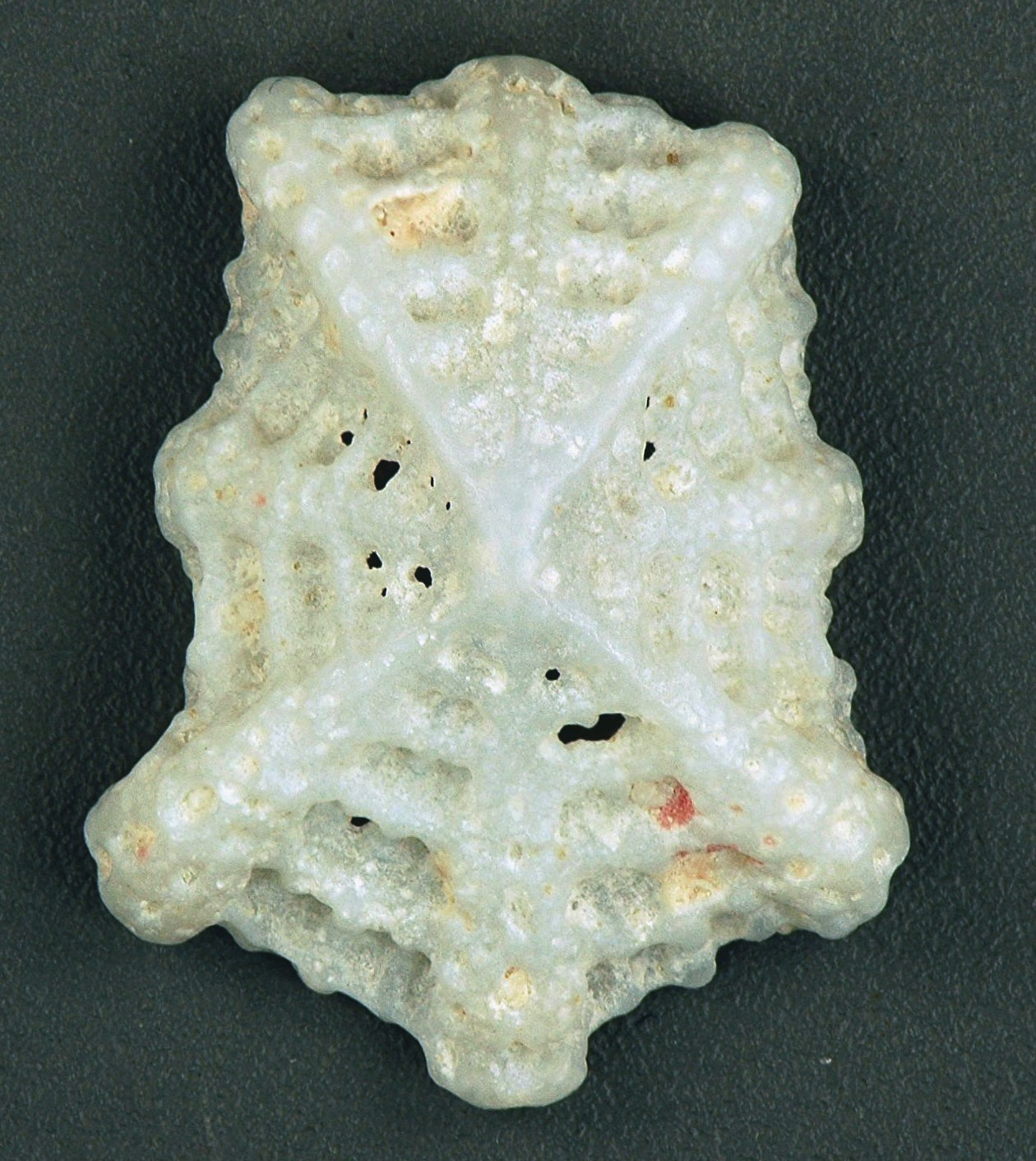
- Montfortia emarginata shell

Scientific classification
- Kingdom: Animalia
- Phylum: Mollusca
- Class: Gastropoda
- Subclass: Vetigastropoda
- Order: Lepetellida
- Family: Fissurellidae
- Subfamily: Zeidorinae
- Genus: Montfortia
- Species: M. emarginata

Binomial name
- Montfortia emarginata (Blainville, 1825)

Synonyms
- Hemitoma emarginata (Blainville, 1825); Hemitoma (Montfortia) emarginata (Blainville, 1825)

= Montfortia emarginata =

Species of gastropod

Montfortia emarginata, common name the emarginate limpet, is a species of sea snail, a marine gastropod mollusk in the family Fissurellidae, the keyhole limpets and slit limpets.

== Description ==
The adult size of the shell varies between 20 mm and 40 mm.

== Distribution ==
This species occurs in the following locations:

- Aruba
- Belize
- Bonaire
- Caribbean Sea
- Cayman Islands
- Colombia
- Cuba
- Curaçao
- Gulf of Mexico
- Jamaica
- Lesser Antilles
- Mexico
- Puerto Rico
- San Andrés
