= Arabica =

Arabica may refer to:

== Food and drink ==
- Coffea arabica, the tree species coffee is most often produced from
- Revalenta arabica, an 18th-century diet for invalids
- % Arabica, a Japanese café chain named after the coffee variety

== Language ==
- Arebica, the Bosnian Arabic alphabet
- Belarusian Arabic alphabet

== Publications ==
- Arabica (journal), a journal of Arabic and Islamic studies
