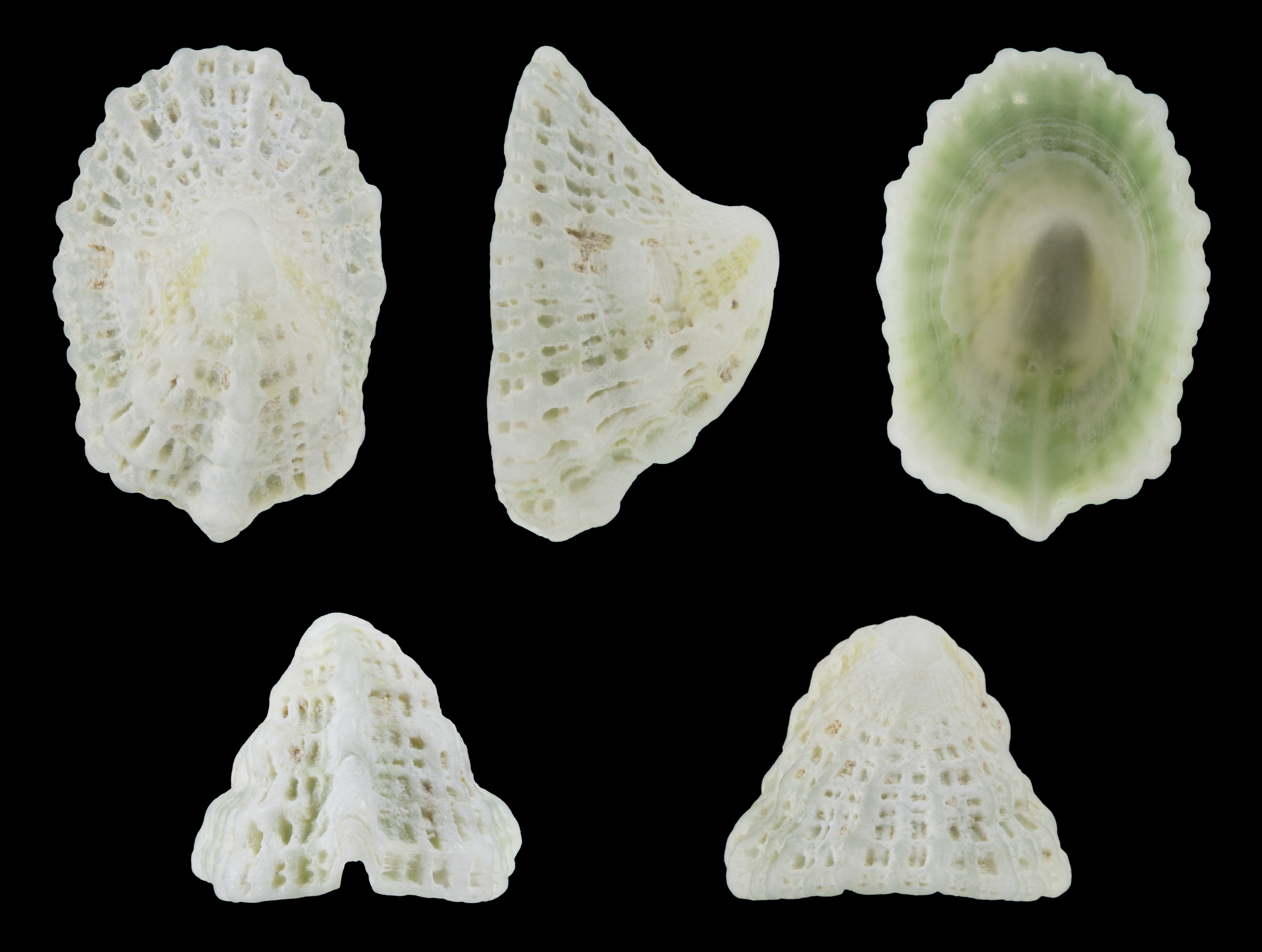

Scientific classification
- Kingdom: Animalia
- Phylum: Mollusca
- Class: Gastropoda
- Subclass: Vetigastropoda
- Order: Lepetellida
- Family: Fissurellidae
- Subfamily: Zeidorinae
- Genus: Montfortista
- Species: M. panhi

Binomial name
- Montfortista panhi (Quoy & Gaimard, 1834)

Synonyms
- List: Emarginula arconatii Issel, 1869; Emarginula clathrata Adams & Reeve, 1850; Emarginula panhi Quoy & Gaimard, 1834; Emarginula tricarinata Pilsbry, 1890; Emarginula panhiensis Reeve, 1842 (unjustified emendation of specific epithet panhi); Hemitoma (Montfortista) panhi (Quoy & Gaimard, 1834); Montfortia panhi (Quoy & Gaimard, 1834); Patella tricarinata Born, 1778; Subemarginula panhi (Quoy & Gaimard, 1834); Subemarginula panhiensis Adams, 1852

= Montfortista panhi =

Species of gastropod

Montfortista panhi, commonly known as cancellate false limpet, is a species of sea snail, a marine gastropod mollusk in the family Fissurellidae, the keyhole limpets and slit limpets.

== Description ==
The size of the shell varies between 7 mm and 18 mm.

== Distribution ==
This species occurs in the Red Sea and the Indo-West Pacific (Tonga Islands).
