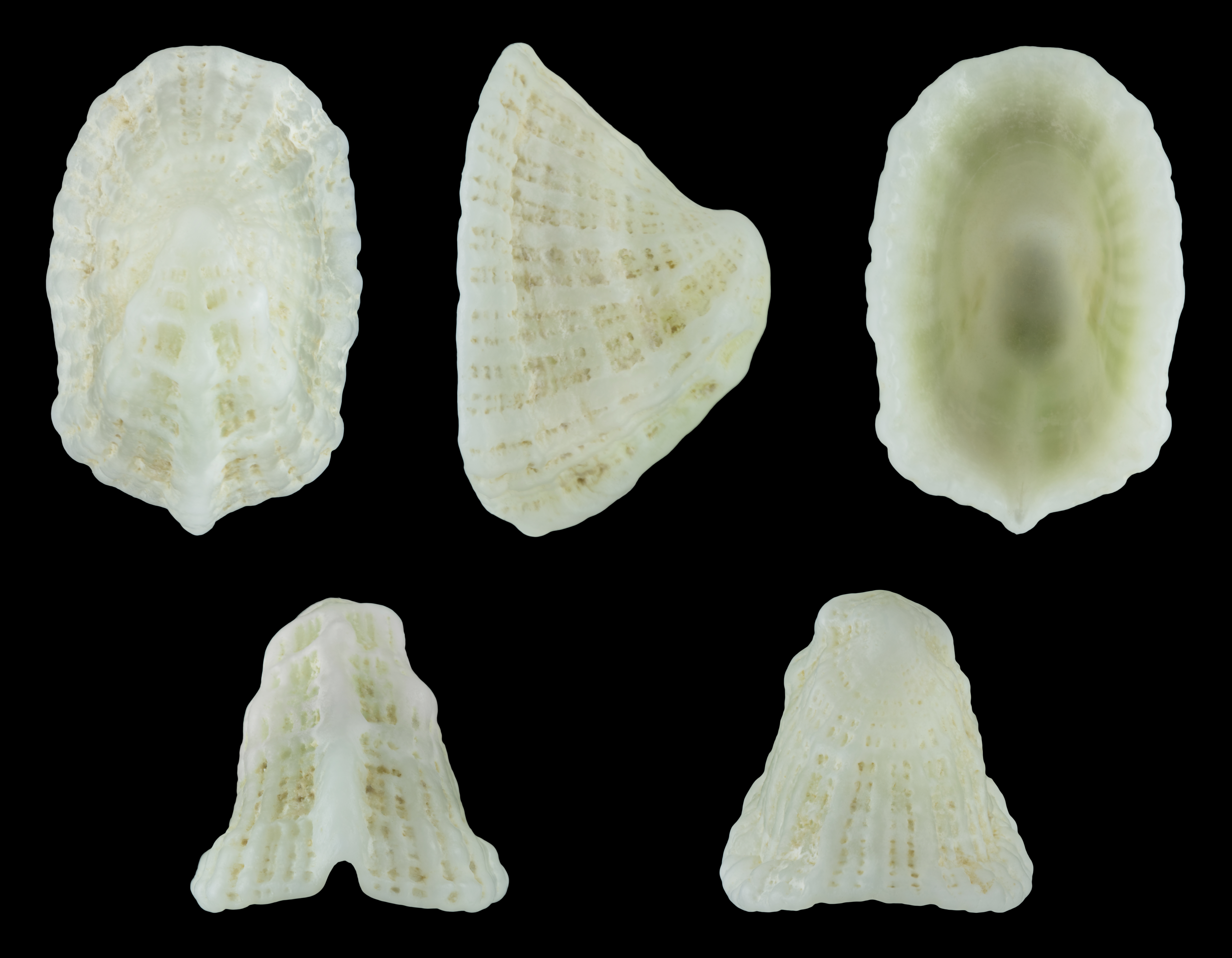

Scientific classification
- Kingdom: Animalia
- Phylum: Mollusca
- Class: Gastropoda
- Subclass: Vetigastropoda
- Order: Lepetellida
- Family: Fissurellidae
- Subfamily: Zeidorinae
- Genus: Montfortista
- Species: M. excentrica

Binomial name
- Montfortista excentrica (Iredale, 1929)

Synonyms
- Hemitoma (Montfortista) excentrica (Iredale, 1929); Montfortia excentrica Iredale, 1929

= Montfortista excentrica =

Species of gastropod

Montfortista excentrica is a species of sea snail, a marine gastropod mollusk in the family Fissurellidae, the keyhole limpets and slit limpets.

== Description ==
The size of the shell typically varies between 6 and 18 mm.

== Distribution ==
This marine species occurs in the Central Indo-West Pacific; off Queensland, Northern Territory, Western Australia, Gulf of Carpentaria; Australia.
