= A. prasina =

A. prasina may refer to:

- Ahaetulla prasina, the Oriental whipsnake, a tree snake species found in South and Southeast Asia
- Anaplectoides prasina, the green arches, a moth species found in the Palearctic realm

== Synonyms ==
- Amydona prasina, a synonym for Trabala vishnou, a moth species found in south-east Asia

== See also ==
- Prasina (disambiguation)
