= E. prasina =

E. prasina may refer to:

- Elaphe prasina, the green trinket snake, green bush rat snake or green ratsnake, a colubrid snake species found in Asia
- Erythrura prasina, the pin-tailed parrotfinch, a bird species found in Southeast Asia
- Eugenia prasina, a plant species endemic to Brazil

== See also ==
- Prasina (disambiguation)
