= P. prasina =

P. prasina may refer to:

- Palomena prasina, the green shield bug, a shield bug species
- Paramantis prasina, a praying mantis species

== See also ==
- Prasina (disambiguation)
