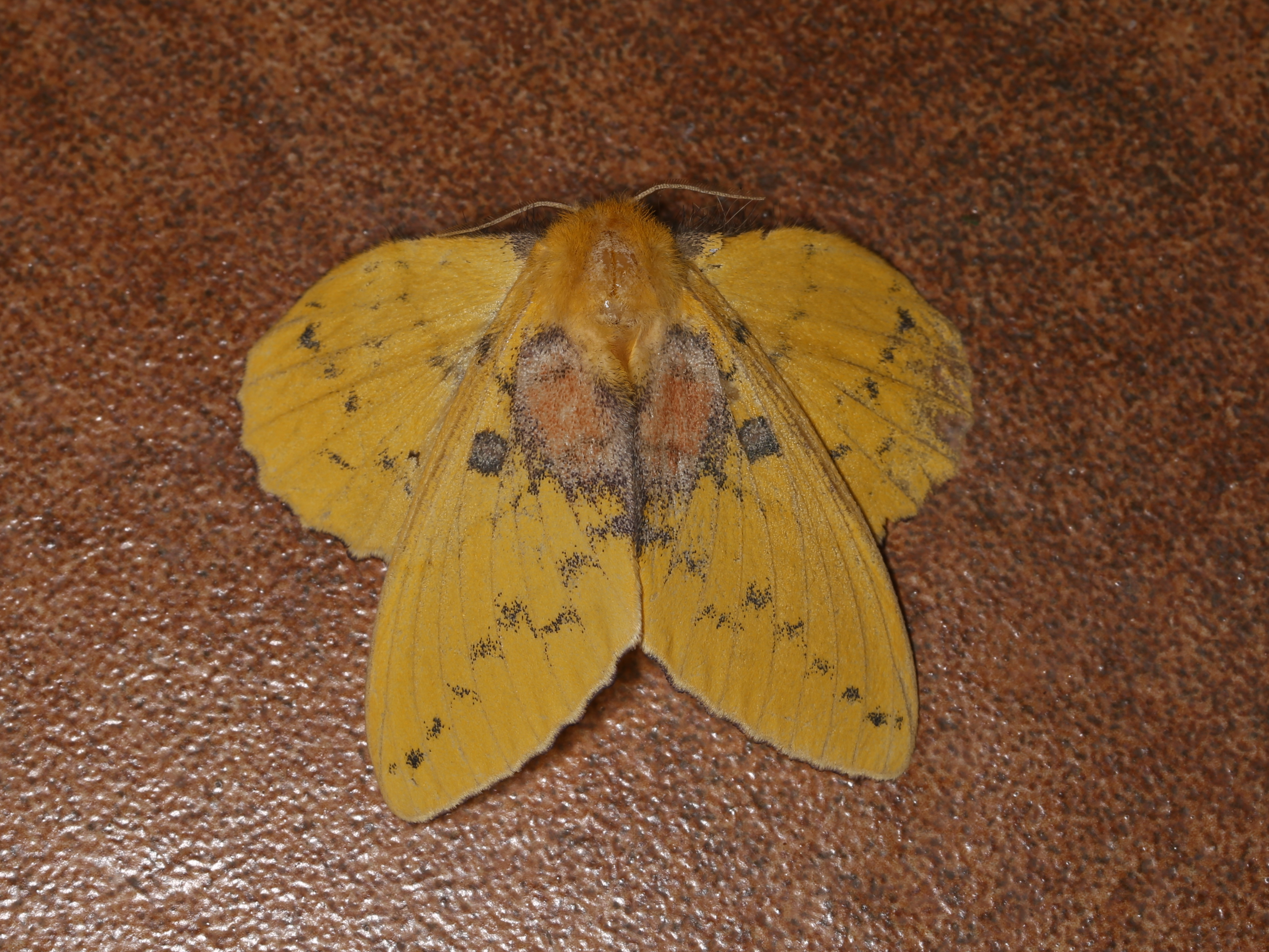

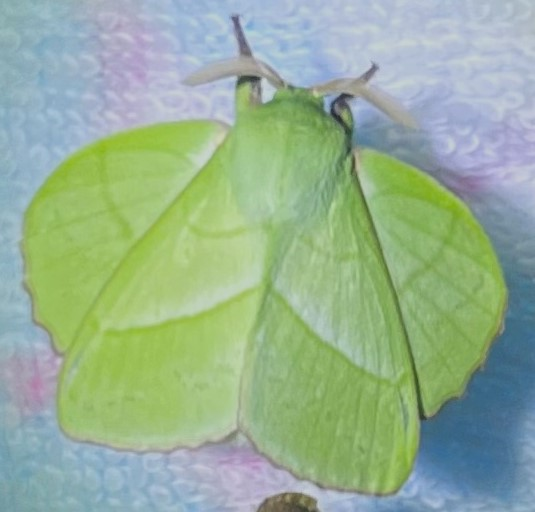

Scientific classification
- Kingdom: Animalia
- Phylum: Arthropoda
- Class: Insecta
- Order: Lepidoptera
- Family: Lasiocampidae
- Genus: Trabala
- Species: T. pallida

Binomial name
- Trabala pallida Walker (1855)

= Trabala pallida =

Species of moth

Trabala pallida is a species of moth in the family Lasiocampidae. They can be found from Southeast China, south throughout Thailand and most of Sundaland. One subspecies is Trabala pallida montana.

== Description ==
=== Eggs ===
Eggs of this species measure around 2 millimetres in length with yellow hairs attached. They are light yellow in early stages and gradually turn dark-greyish. They can be found in clusters on host plants.

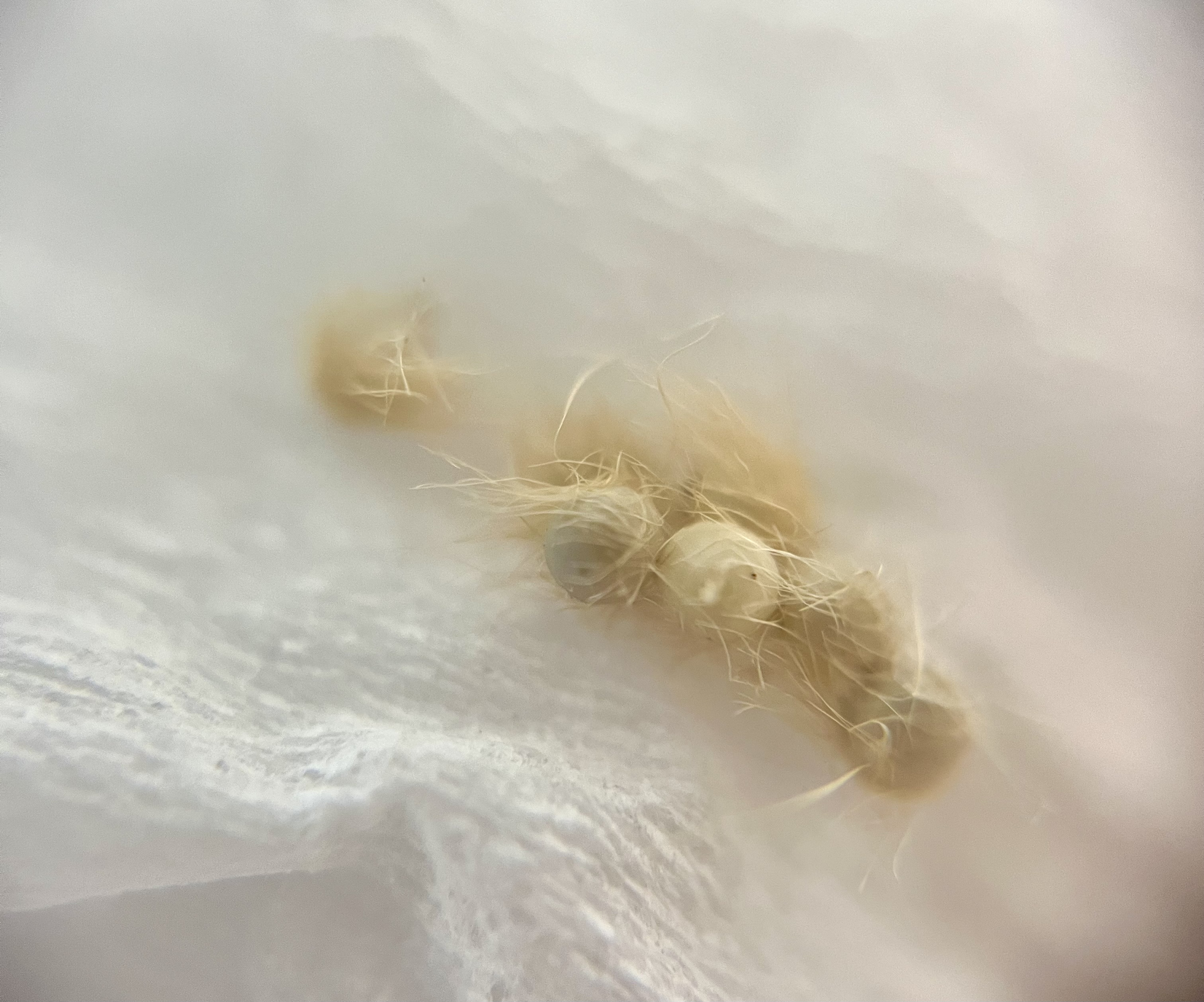
Eggs of Trabala pallida; around a week old

=== Larval stage ===
Most caterpillars of this species go through five instars. In the wild, their host plants include Terminalia, Lagerstroemia, Melastoma, Persea, Psidium, Punica and Sclerocarya. Larvae are polyphagous.

==== 1st instar ====
Body length is around 1.5cm. The caterpillars are yellow in color with a popcorn-like red head, and have black lateral stripes along their body. They are covered in long black and white hairs. Two bundles of deep-brown hairs protrude from the prothorax. Legs and prolegs are bright red in all instars.

==== 2nd instar ====
Body length is around 2cm. Similar to caterpillars of the 1st instar, but prothoracic hairs are more longer. Prothoracic hairs get longer and thicker with each instar.

==== 3rd instar ====
Body length is around 3.5cm. Caterpillar turns a brighter shade of yellow. Blue tubercules are now more prominent.

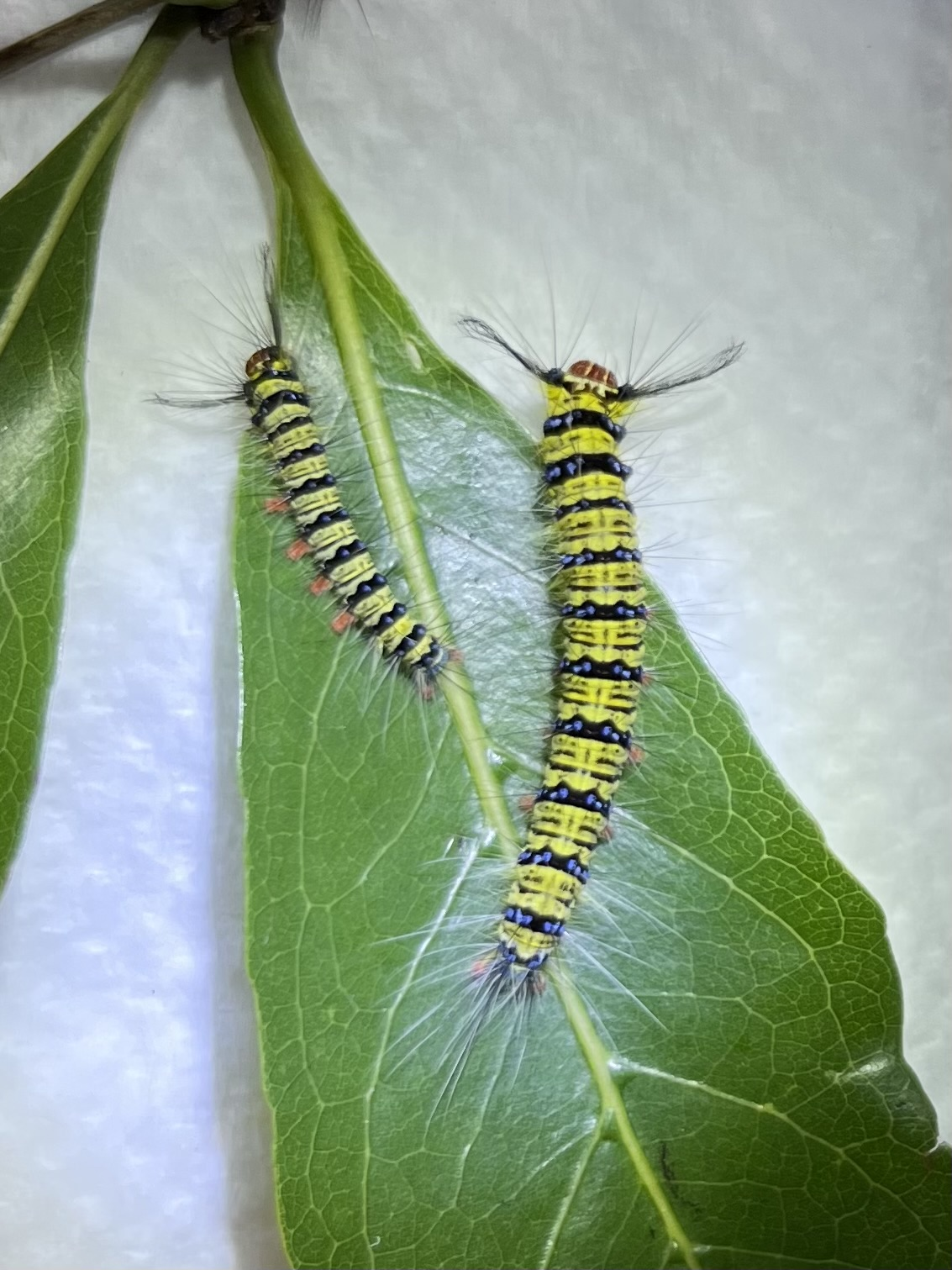
Picture of 2 larvae on a Terminalia Mantaly leaf; L2 on the left, L3 on the right.

==== 5th instar ====
Caterpillars range from yellow to deep orange. Tufts of yellow or orange hair grow along the sides of each segment. These hairs are irritating to susceptible people. A white vertical line runs down the dorsal side of the body. Two tufts of white hair are situated at the anterior and posterior of the body.

=== Pupal stage ===
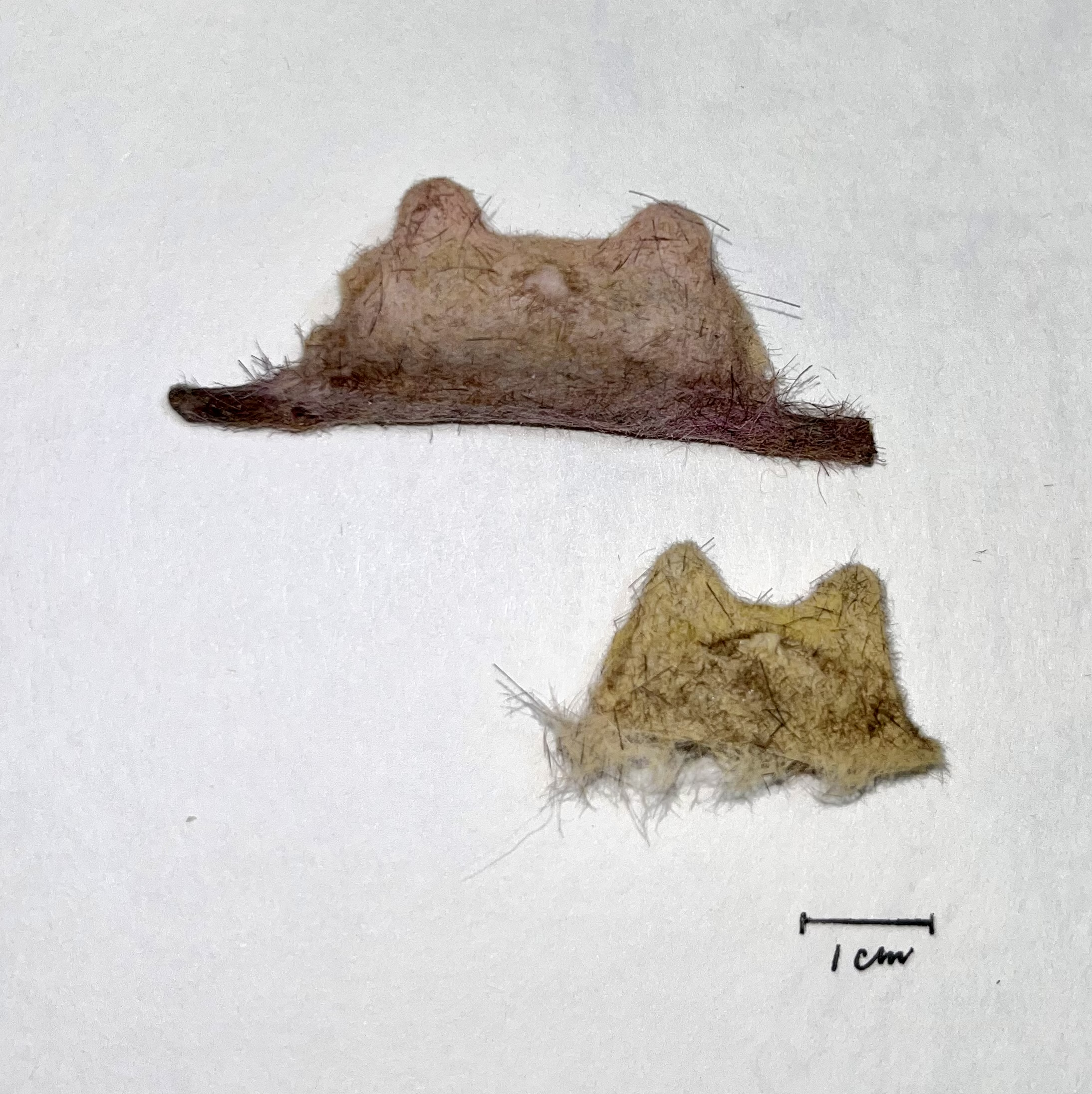
A picture comparing the sizes of male and female Trabala Pallida cocoons. Female cocoon above the male. (1cm for scale)

They will spin an ochre cocoon with two humps and covered in black urticating hairs. Some cocoons have a mild purplish or reddish tints. Cocoons of females are bigger than males'. Caterpillars will expel their moulted skin from their cocoon. The moths emerge after around 10 days.

=== Adult stage ===
The wingspan of a male is 35~42 mm and 62~72 mm for females.

Males are pale apple green in color and have bipectinate antennae. They have darker green lines at their antemedial and postmedial lines, and a line of darker green spots along the subterminal line in the forewings. There is a slight white gradient spanning the antimedial and postmedial area of the forewings, and the anal margin of the hindwings. There are also darker green lines at the inner band and spots at the outer band of the hindwings. Both forewings and hindwings have a brown fringe.

Females occur in different colorings: a pale or cadmium yellow, an ochreous form with different intensity, and a greenish form, which is rare among females. The darker lines at the antimedial and postmedial lines in the forewings are less visible, whereas a vague black line can still be seen at the inner band in the hindwings in females. There is a clear line of dark-brown or black spots at the subterminal line of the forewings and outer band of hindwings. The white gradient in the anal margin is more mild compared to males. Their forewings and hindwings have black fringes. Females also have bipectinate antennae. They have a medial patch on inner margins of their forewings. Medial patches of females of Pallida have a reddish-brown patch situated in the centre, which are distinguishable from the visually similar females of vishnou, where the medial patches lean more towards brown or light reddish-brown.

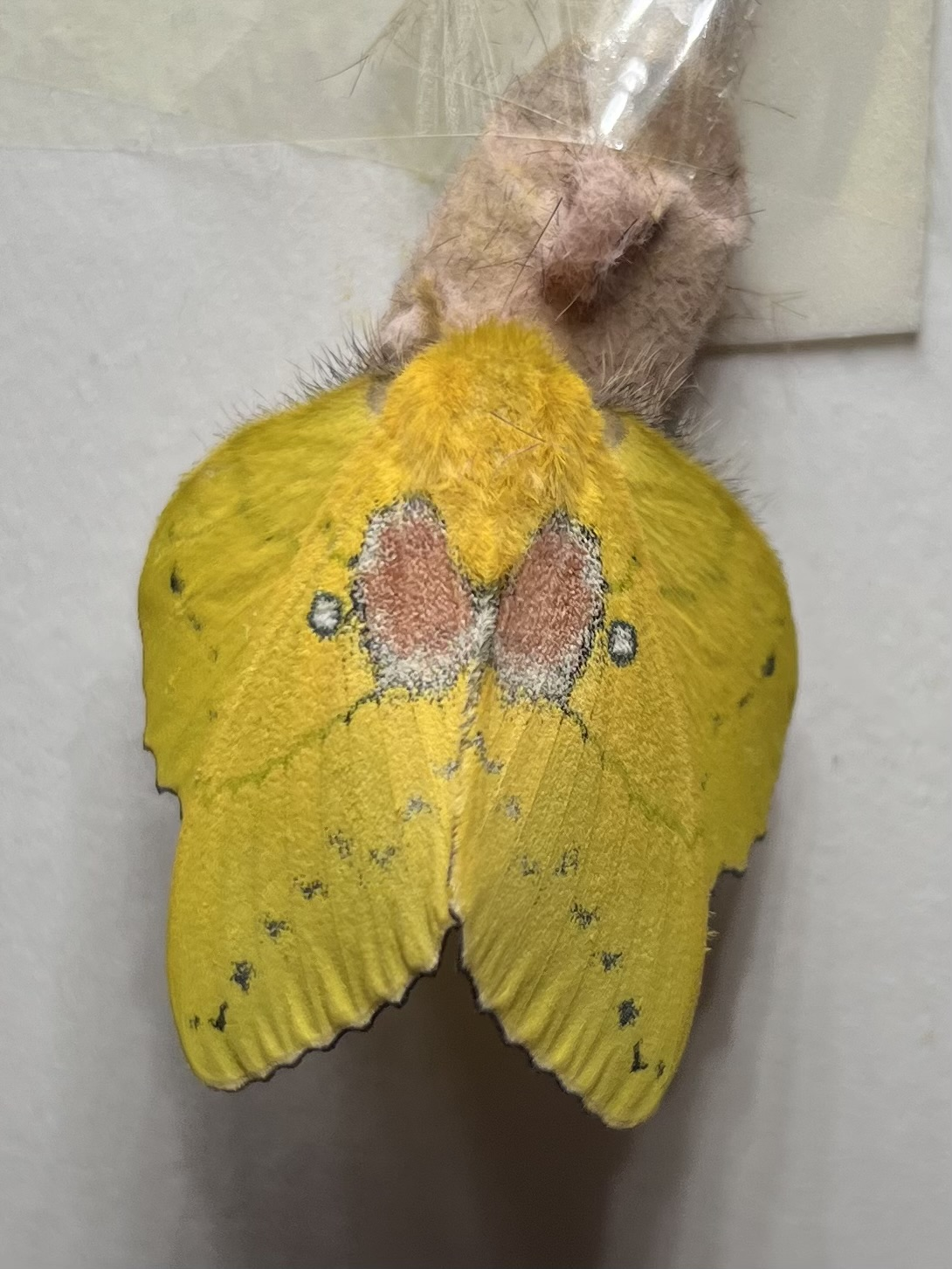
Picture of a newly emerged female

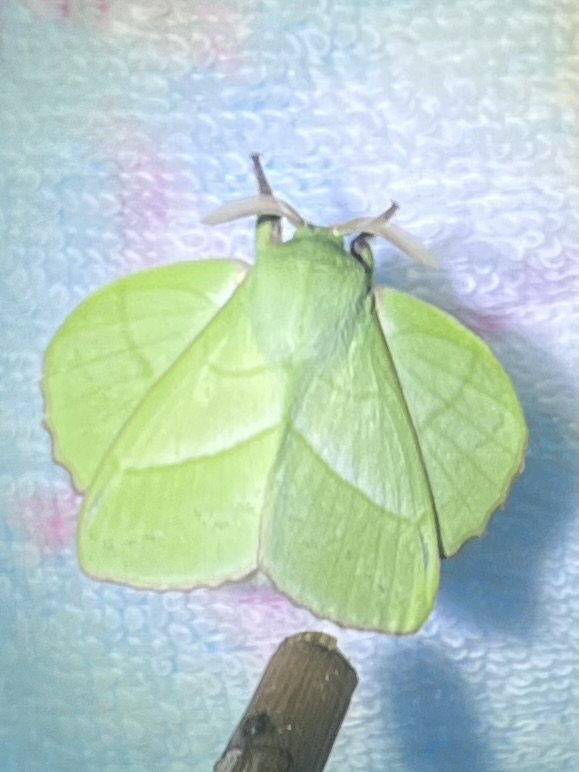
Picture of a male

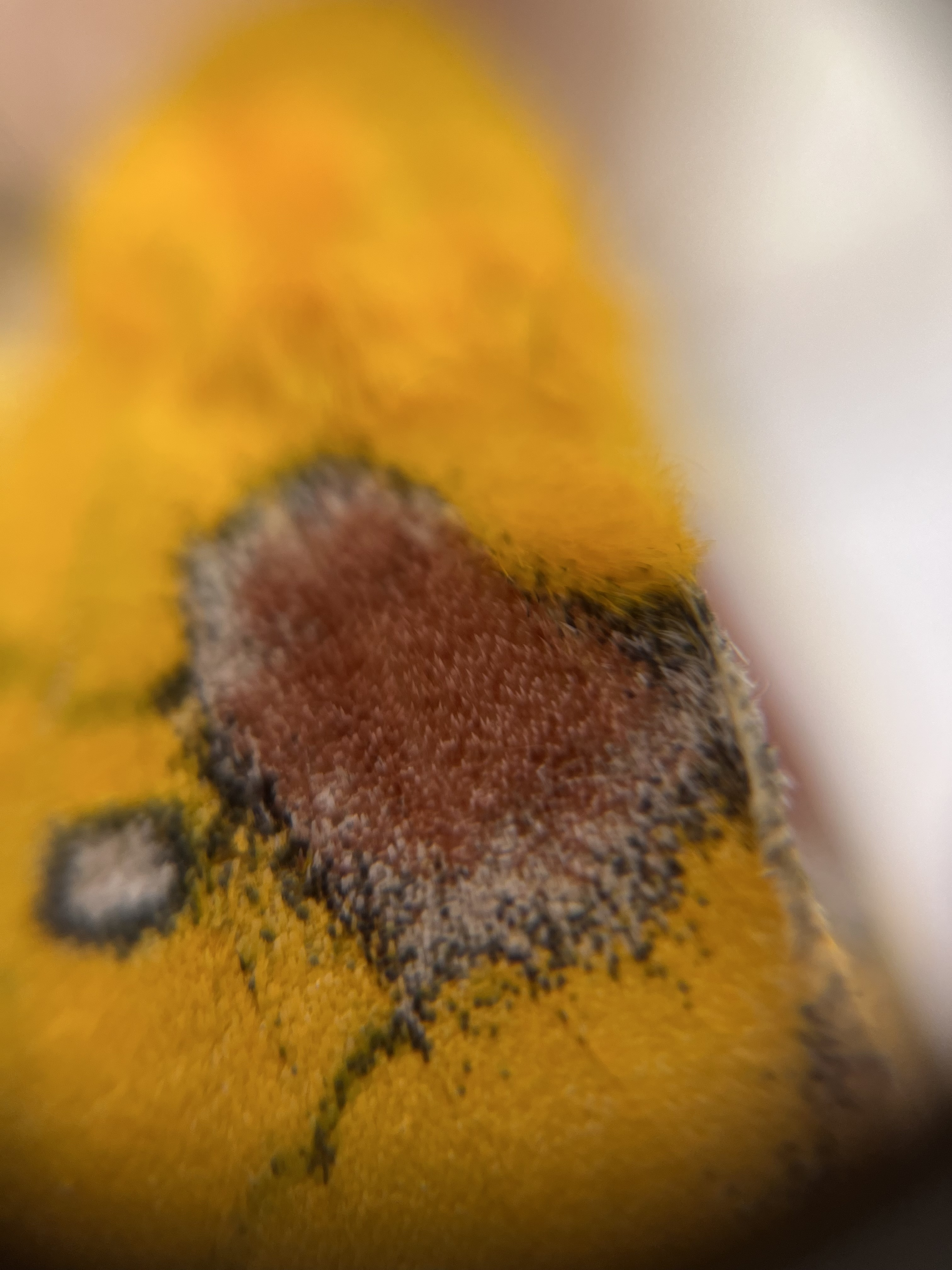
A close-up of the medial spot on a female
