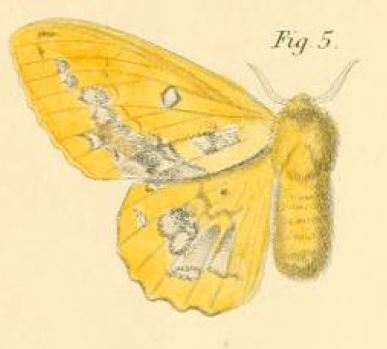

Scientific classification
- Kingdom: Animalia
- Phylum: Arthropoda
- Class: Insecta
- Order: Lepidoptera
- Family: Lasiocampidae
- Genus: Trabala
- Species: T. burchardii

Binomial name
- Trabala burchardii (Dewitz, 1881)

Synonyms
- Amydona burchardii Dewitz, 1881

= Trabala burchardii =

Species of moth

Trabala burchardii is a moth of the family Lasiocampidae. The species was first described by Hermann Dewitz in 1881. It is found in Angola, Cameroon, Equatorial Guinea, Kenya, Nigeria and Ghana.
