= Trabala lambourni =

Scientific classification
- Kingdom: Animalia
- Phylum: Arthropoda
- Class: Insecta
- Order: Lepidoptera
- Family: Lasiocampidae
- Genus: Trabala
- Species: T. lambourni

Binomial name
- Trabala lambourni Bethune-Baker, 1911

Species of moth

Trabala lambourni is a moth of the family Lasiocampidae first described by George Thomas Bethune-Baker in 1911. It is found in Nigeria and the Democratic Republic of the Congo.

== Biology ==
A known host plant is Terminalia catappa.
