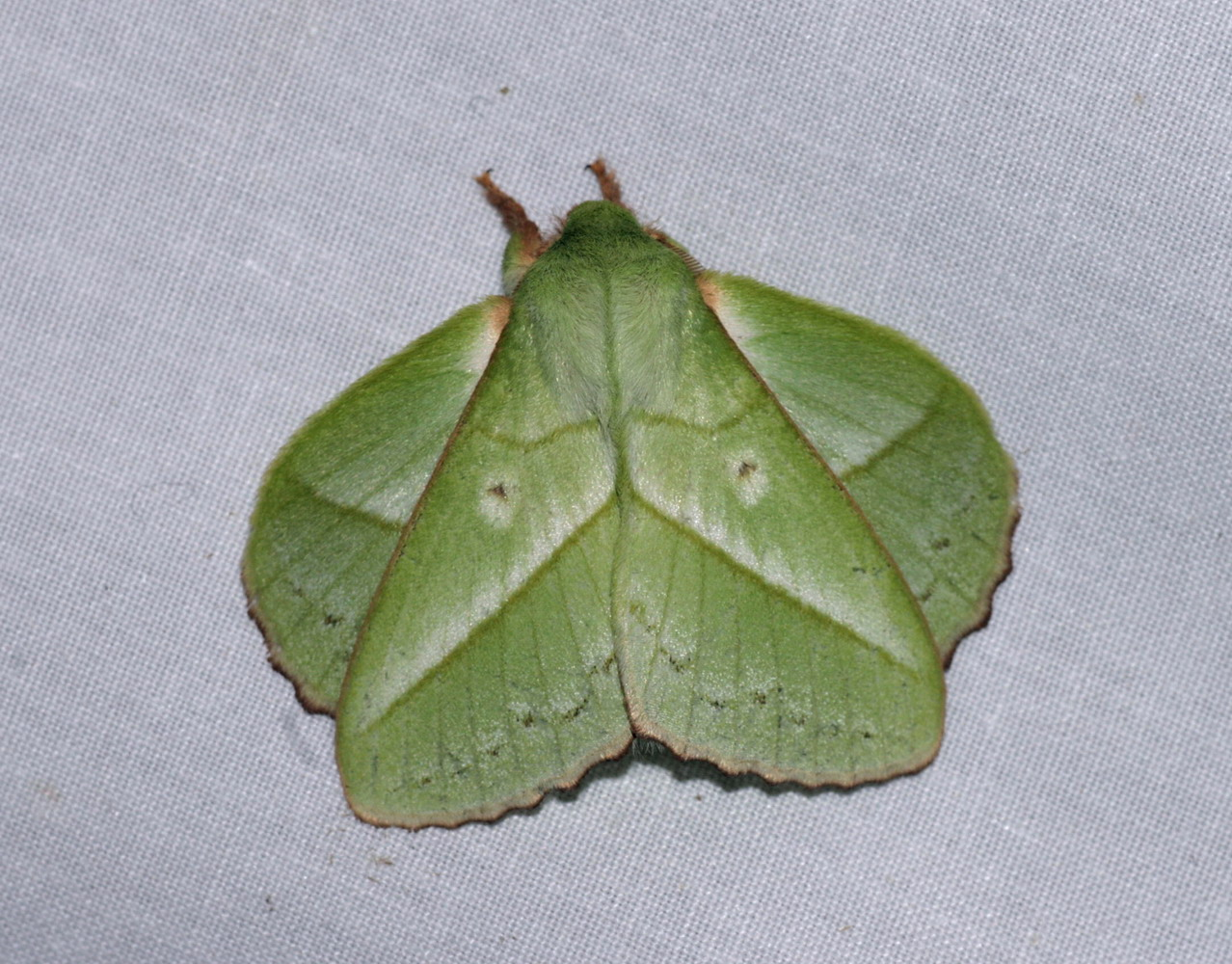
- Male from Borneo

Scientific classification
- Domain: Eukaryota
- Kingdom: Animalia
- Phylum: Arthropoda
- Class: Insecta
- Order: Lepidoptera
- Family: Lasiocampidae
- Genus: Trabala
- Species: T. ganesha

Binomial name
- Trabala ganesha Roepke, 1951

= Trabala ganesha =

Species of moth

Trabala ganesha is a moth of the family Lasiocampidae first described by Walter Karl Johann Roepke in 1951. It is found in Sundaland.
