= Trabala prasinophena =

Scientific classification
- Kingdom: Animalia
- Phylum: Arthropoda
- Class: Insecta
- Order: Lepidoptera
- Family: Lasiocampidae
- Genus: Trabala
- Species: T. prasinophena

Binomial name
- Trabala prasinophena Tams, 1931

Species of moth

Trabala prasinophena is a moth of the family Lasiocampidae first described by Willie Horace Thomas Tams in 1931. It is found in the Democratic Republic of the Congo.
