= Paramantis nyassana =

Scientific classification
- Kingdom: Animalia
- Phylum: Arthropoda
- Clade: Pancrustacea
- Class: Insecta
- Order: Mantodea
- Family: Mantidae
- Genus: Paramantis
- Species: P. nyassana

Binomial name
- Paramantis nyassana Giglio-Tos, 1912

Species of praying mantis

Paramantis nyassana is a species of praying mantis in the family Mantidae. Before a 1998 paper showed it was present in Zimbabwe it was "hitherto unknown in Africa south of the Zambezi River".
