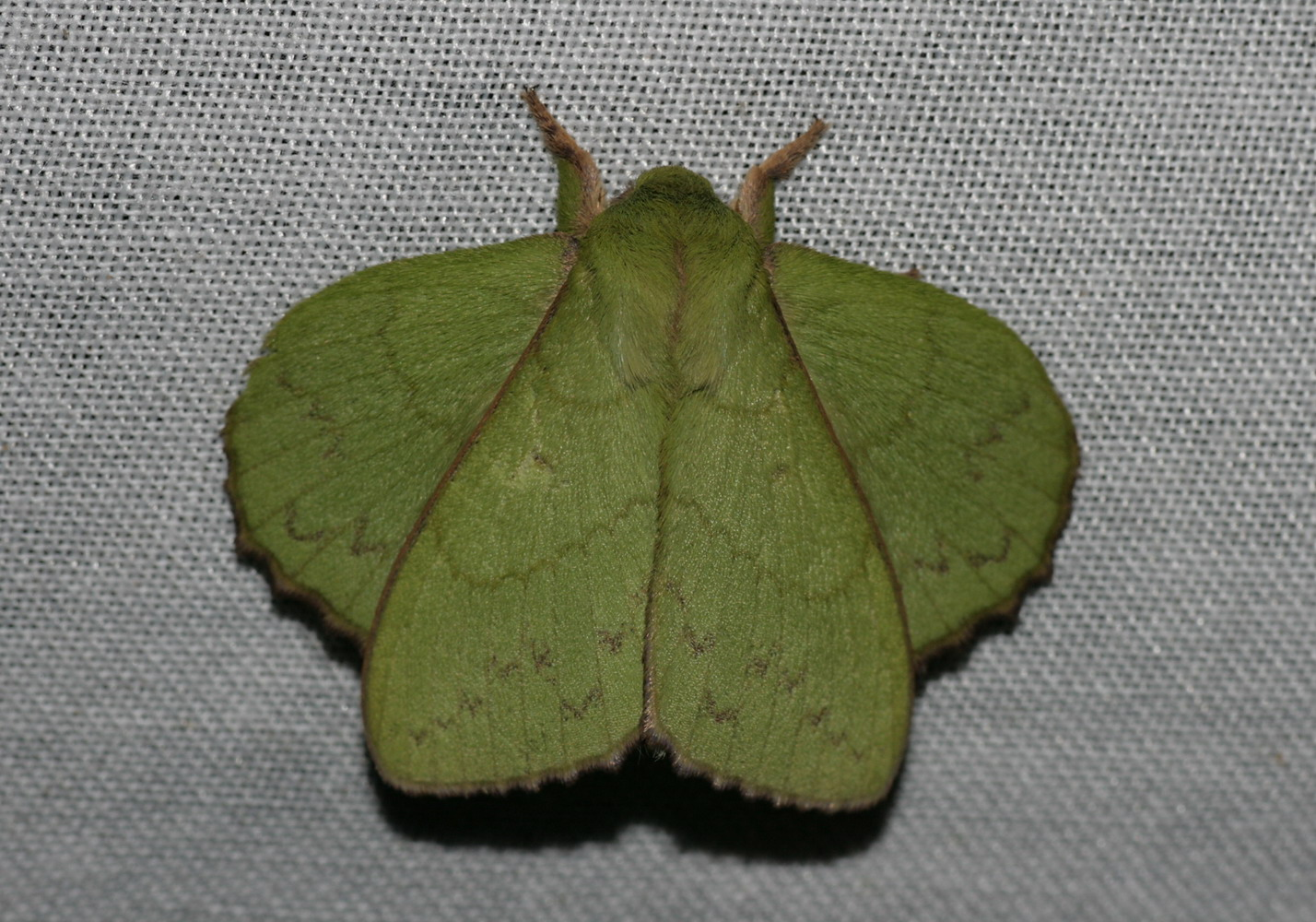

Scientific classification
- Domain: Eukaryota
- Kingdom: Animalia
- Phylum: Arthropoda
- Class: Insecta
- Order: Lepidoptera
- Family: Lasiocampidae
- Genus: Trabala
- Species: T. viridana

Binomial name
- Trabala viridana Joicey & Talbot, 1917

Synonyms
- Trabala indra Roepke, 1951

= Trabala viridana =

Species of moth

Trabala viridana, the Sunda green Vishnu-moth, is a moth of the family Lasiocampidae. The species was first described by James John Joicey and George Talbot in 1917. It is found in Sumatra, Borneo and Peninsular Malaysia.
