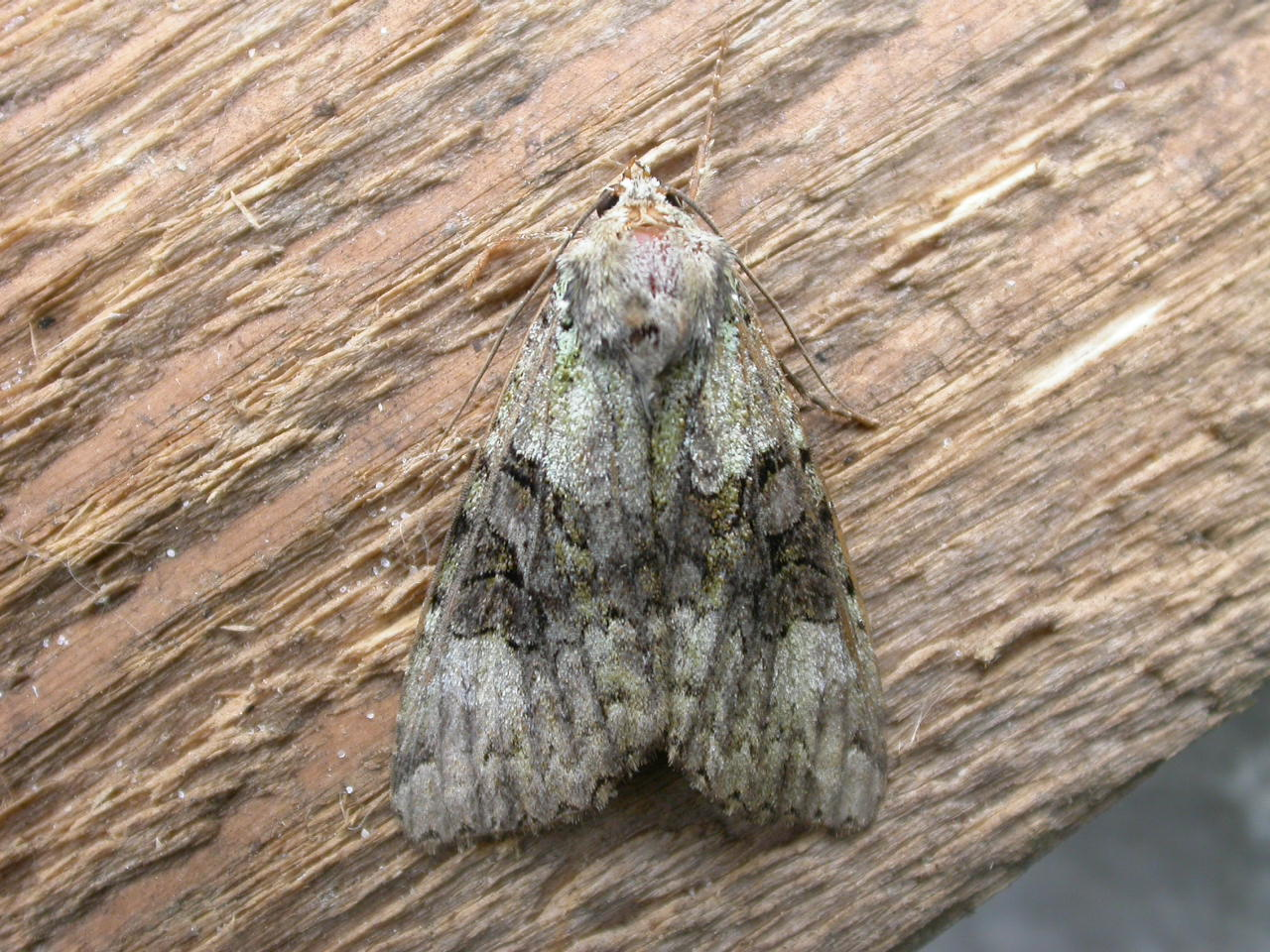
- Anaplectoides prasina

Scientific classification
- Domain: Eukaryota
- Kingdom: Animalia
- Phylum: Arthropoda
- Class: Insecta
- Order: Lepidoptera
- Superfamily: Noctuoidea
- Family: Noctuidae
- Subtribe: Noctuina
- Genus: Anaplectoides; McDunnough, [1929]

= Anaplectoides =

Genus of moths

Anaplectoides is a genus of moths of the family Noctuidae.

== Species ==
- Anaplectoides brunneomedia McDunnough, 1946
- Anaplectoides colorata (Corti & Draudt, 1933)
- Anaplectoides fuscivirens Sugi, 1995
- Anaplectoides inexpectata Dierl, 1983
- Anaplectoides inouei Plante, 1987
- Anaplectoides magnifica (Moore, 1882)
- Anaplectoides perviridis (Warren, 1912)
- Anaplectoides phaeotaenia Boursin, 1955
- Anaplectoides prasina – green arches ([Schiffermüller], 1775)
- Anaplectoides pressus (Grote, 1874)
- Anaplectoides semivirens Ronkay & Ronkay, 1999
- Anaplectoides tamsi Boursin, 1955
- Anaplectoides virens (Butler, 1878)
