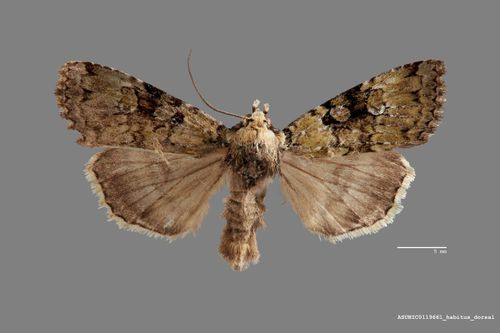

Scientific classification
- Kingdom: Animalia
- Phylum: Arthropoda
- Class: Insecta
- Order: Lepidoptera
- Superfamily: Noctuoidea
- Family: Noctuidae
- Genus: Anaplectoides
- Species: A. brunneomedia

Binomial name
- Anaplectoides brunneomedia McDunnough, 1946

= Anaplectoides brunneomedia =

Brown-lined dart

Species of moth

Anaplectoides brunneomedia (brown-lined dart) is a moth of the family Noctuidae. It is known from only a few localities in the Appalachian Mountains in West Virginia, Virginia, Kentucky, Tennessee, and North Carolina.

The wingspan is about 40 mm. Adults are on wing from June to August.
