= Trabala aethiopica =

Scientific classification
- Kingdom: Animalia
- Phylum: Arthropoda
- Class: Insecta
- Order: Lepidoptera
- Family: Lasiocampidae
- Genus: Trabala
- Species: T. aethiopica

Binomial name
- Trabala aethiopica (Strand, 1912)

Synonyms
- Crinocraspeda aethiopica Strand, 1912

Species of moth

Trabala aethiopica is a moth of the family Lasiocampidae. The species was first described by Embrik Strand in 1912. It is found in the Democratic Republic of the Congo and Equatorial Guinea.
