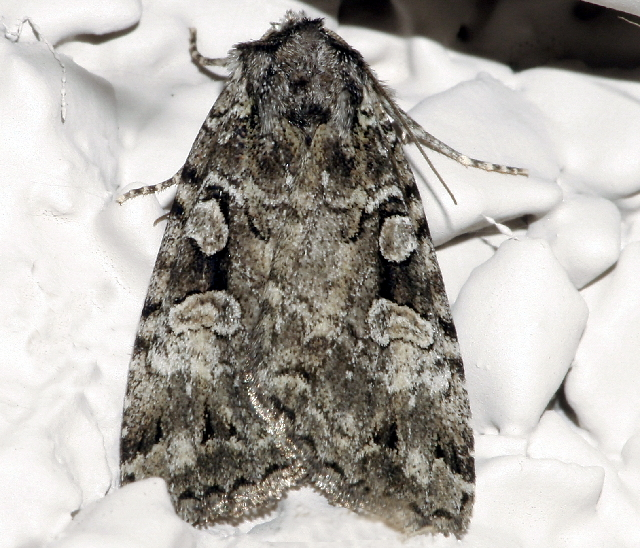

Scientific classification
- Kingdom: Animalia
- Phylum: Arthropoda
- Clade: Pancrustacea
- Class: Insecta
- Order: Lepidoptera
- Superfamily: Noctuoidea
- Family: Noctuidae
- Genus: Anaplectoides
- Species: A. pressus

Binomial name
- Anaplectoides pressus (Grote, 1874)

= Anaplectoides pressus =

Species of moth

Anaplectoides pressus, commonly known as the dappled dart moth, is a species of cutworm or dart moth in the family Noctuidae. It is found in North America.
