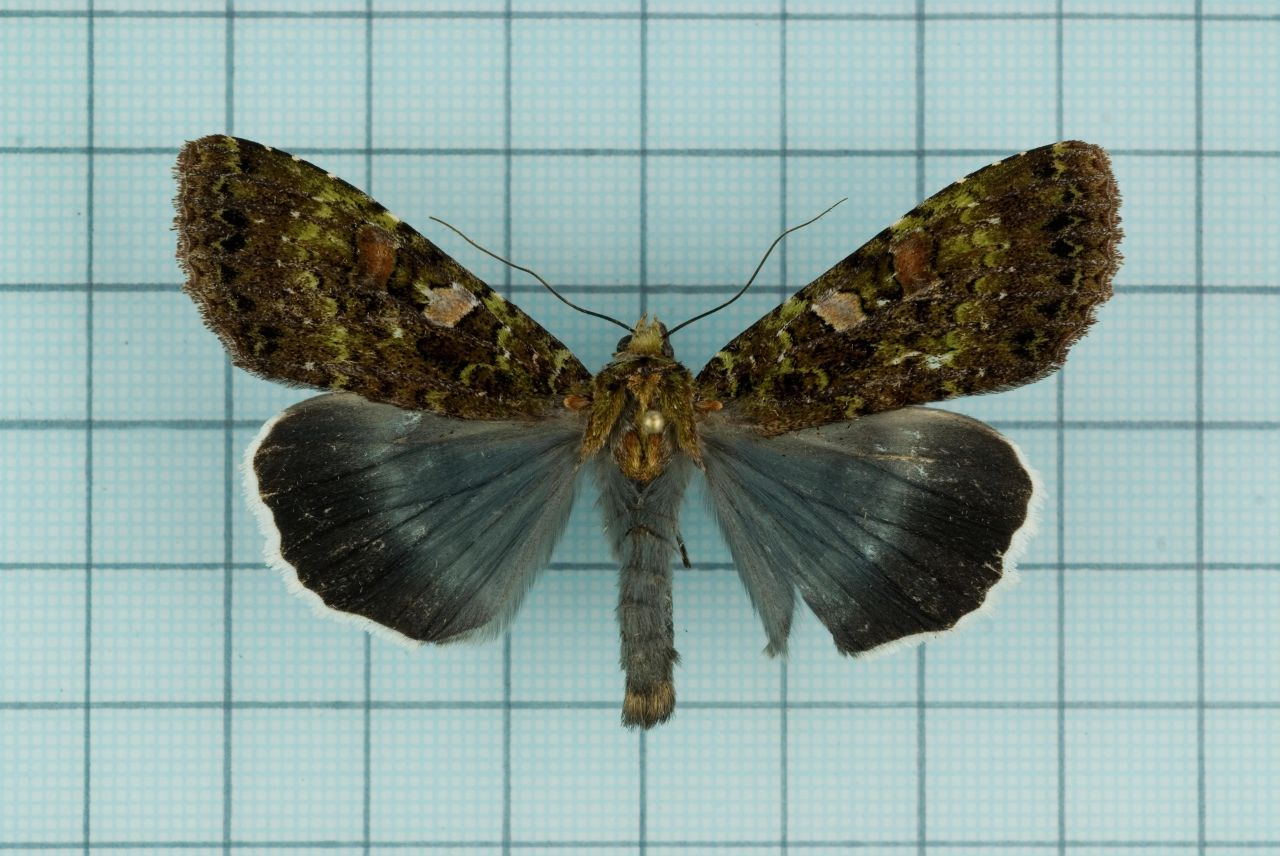

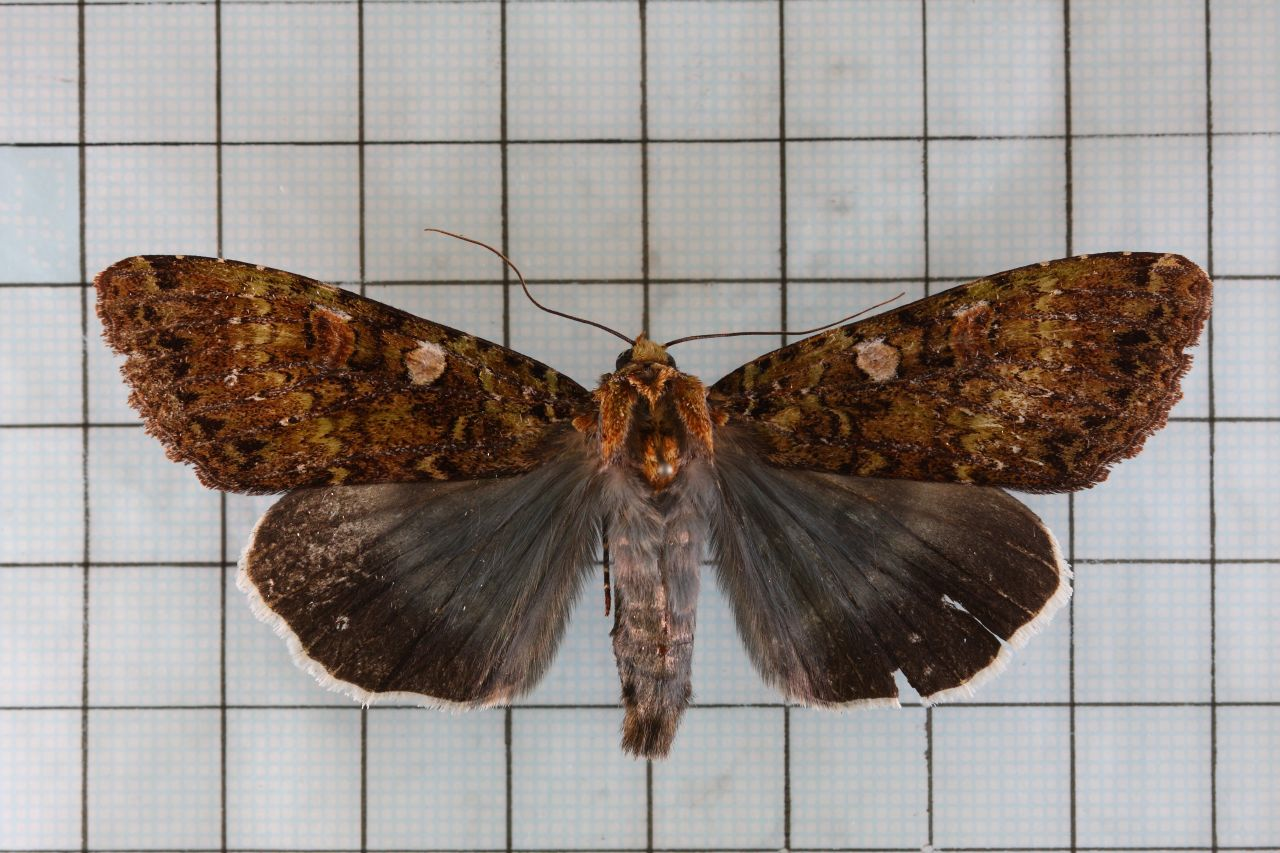

Scientific classification
- Domain: Eukaryota
- Kingdom: Animalia
- Phylum: Arthropoda
- Class: Insecta
- Order: Lepidoptera
- Superfamily: Noctuoidea
- Family: Noctuidae
- Genus: Anaplectoides
- Species: A. inouei

Binomial name
- Anaplectoides inouei Plante, 1987

= Anaplectoides inouei =

Species of moth

Anaplectoides inouei is a moth of the family Noctuidae. It is found in Taiwan.
