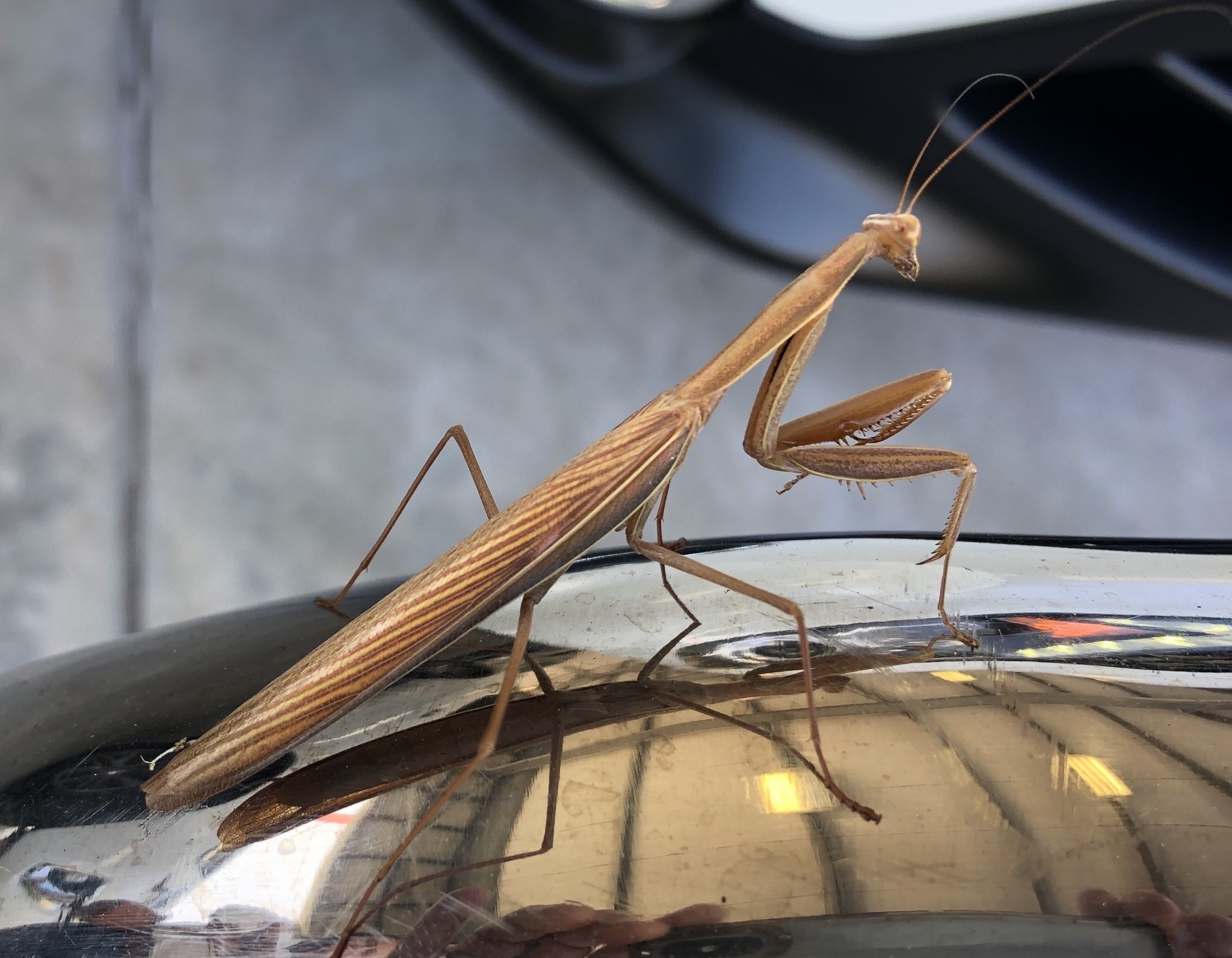

Scientific classification
- Kingdom: Animalia
- Phylum: Arthropoda
- Clade: Pancrustacea
- Class: Insecta
- Order: Mantodea
- Family: Mantidae
- Subfamily: Tenoderinae
- Tribe: Paramantini
- Genus: Paramantis; Ragge & Roy, 1967

= Paramantis =

Genus of praying mantises

Paramantis is a genus of praying mantises that includes these species:

- Paramantis natalensis
- Paramantis nyassana
- Paramantis prasina - type species
- Paramantis sacra
- Paramantis togana
- Paramantis victoriana
- Paramantis viridis

== See also ==
- List of mantis genera and species
