= Paramantis togana =

Scientific classification
- Kingdom: Animalia
- Phylum: Arthropoda
- Clade: Pancrustacea
- Class: Insecta
- Order: Mantodea
- Family: Mantidae
- Genus: Paramantis
- Species: P. togana

Binomial name
- Paramantis togana (Giglio-Tos, 1912)

Synonyms
- Mantis togana Giglio-Tos, 1912; Miomantis togana (Giglio-Tos, 1912)

Species of praying mantis

Paramantis togana is a species of praying mantis in the family Mantidae.

== See also ==
- List of mantis genera and species
