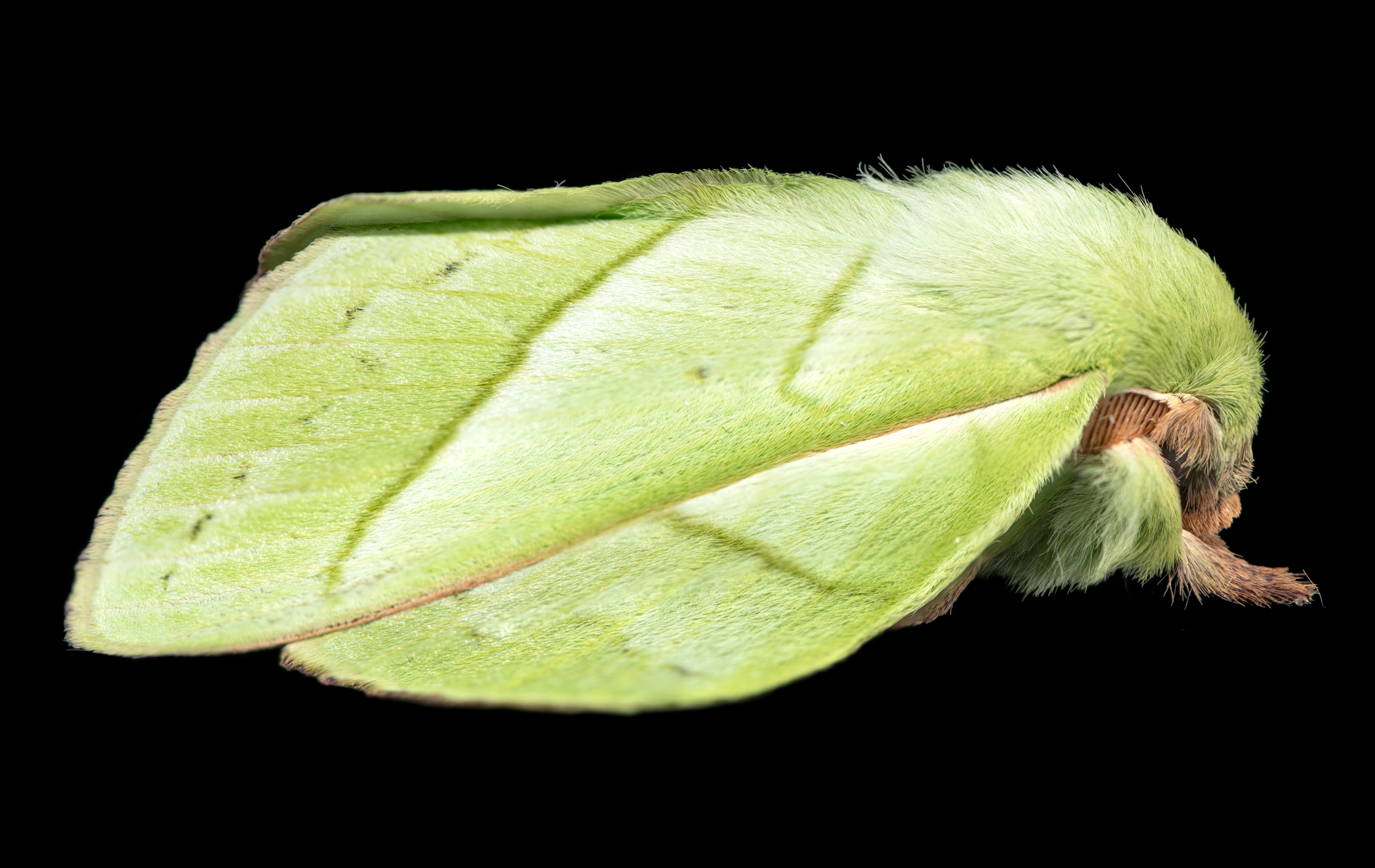
- Trabala vishnou

Scientific classification
- Kingdom: Animalia
- Phylum: Arthropoda
- Class: Insecta
- Order: Lepidoptera
- Family: Lasiocampidae
- Subfamily: Lasiocampinae
- Genus: Trabala; Walker, 1856

Type species
- Amydona prasina Walker, 1855

= Trabala =

Genus of moths

Trabala is a genus of moths in the family Lasiocampidae described by Francis Walker in 1856.

== Description ==
Palpi somewhat short and slight. Antennae with branches shorter in females than in males. Mid and hind tibia with a minute terminal pair of spurs. Forewings are broad, with rounded outer margin, where the cell is open. The stalk of veins 9 and 10 very long. Hindwings with open cell. Veins 6 and 7 arising very near the base. Accessory costal veinlets are absent.

== Species ==
Some species of this genus are:

- Trabala aethiopica (Strand, 1912) (from Congo/Eq.Guinea)
- Trabala bouraq Holloway, 1987 (from Brunei)
- Trabala burchardii (Dewitz, 1881) (from Angola/Cameroon/Kenya)
- Trabala charon Druce, 1910 (from Central Africa)
- Trabala ganesha Roepke, 1951 (from Sundaland)
- Trabala garuda Roepke, 1951 (from Borneo/Sumatra)
- Trabala gautama Roepke, 1951 (from Malaysia/Borneo/Sumatra)
- Trabala hantu Roepke, 1951 (from Borneo/Sumatra)
- Trabala irrorata Moore, 1884 (from Sundaland/Philippines)
- Trabala krishna Roepke, 1951 (from Sundaland)
- Trabala lambourni Bethune-Baker, 1911 (from Congo/Nigeria)
- Trabala pallida (Walker, 1855) (from Sundaland/China)
- Trabala prasinophena Tams, 1931 (from Congo)
- Trabala rotundapex Holloway, 1976 (from Borneo)
- Trabala shiva Roepke, 1951 (from Sundaland)
- Trabala sulphurea (Kollar, 1848) (from India)
- Trabala viridana Joicey & Talbot, 1917 (from Sumatra/Borneo/Malaysia)
- Trabala vishnou (Lefèbvre, 1827) (Oriental, India to Taiwan)
