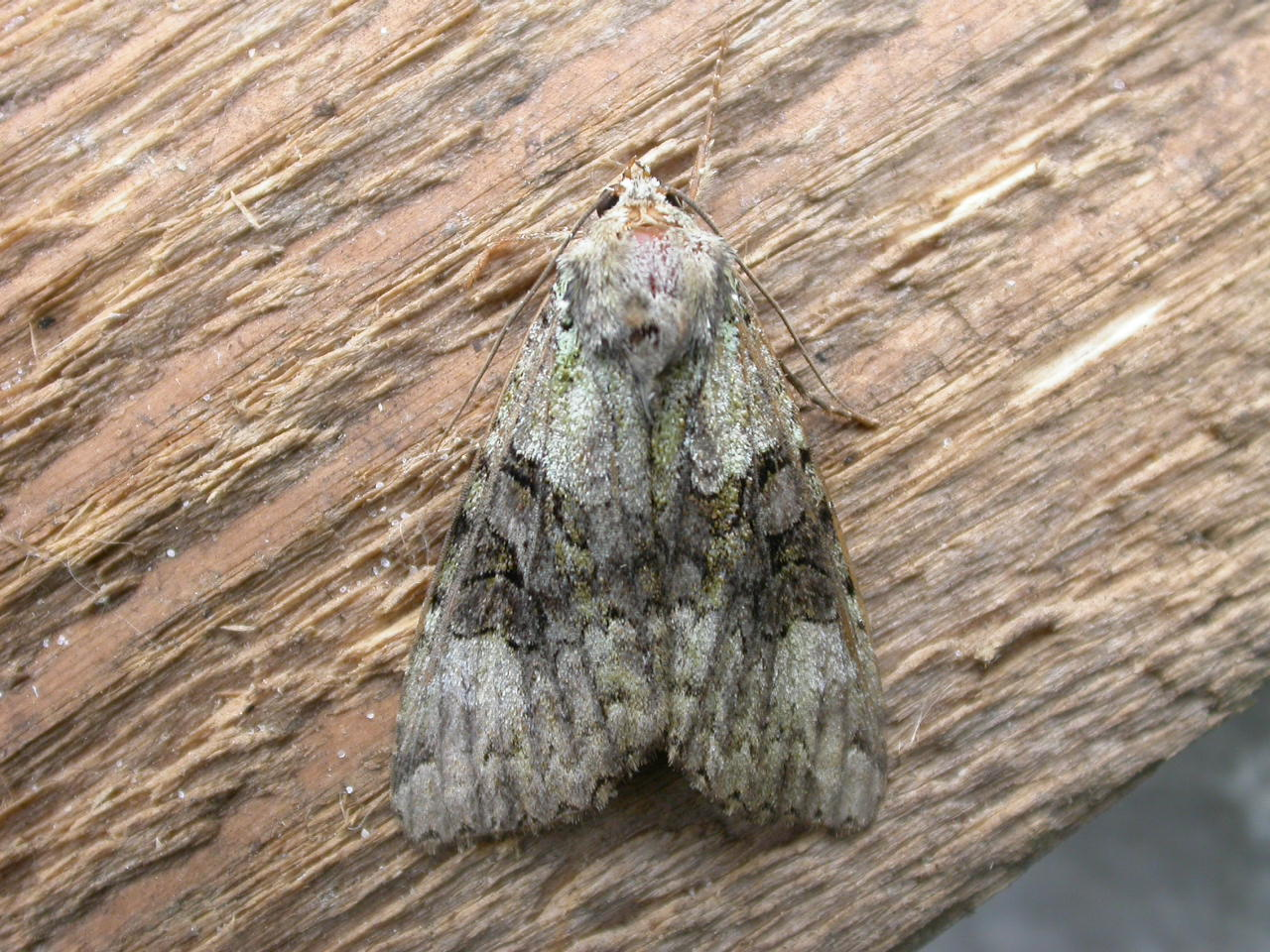

Scientific classification
- Domain: Eukaryota
- Kingdom: Animalia
- Phylum: Arthropoda
- Class: Insecta
- Order: Lepidoptera
- Superfamily: Noctuoidea
- Family: Noctuidae
- Genus: Anaplectoides
- Species: A. prasina

Binomial name
- Anaplectoides prasina (Denis & Schiffermüller, 1775)

= Anaplectoides prasina =

Green arches

Species of moth

Anaplectoides prasina (green arches) is a species of moth of the family Noctuidae. It is found in both the Palearctic and Nearctic realms.

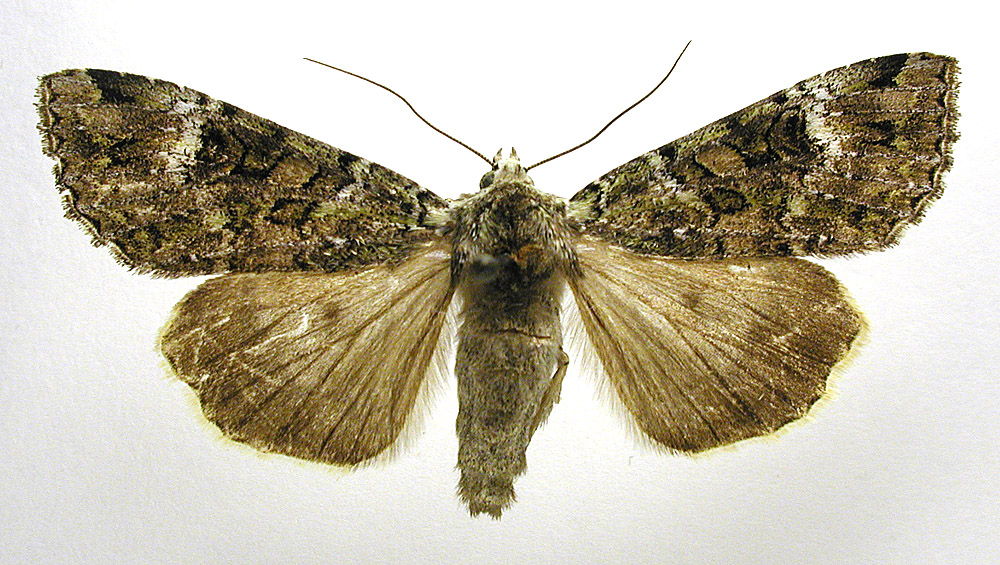
Mounted

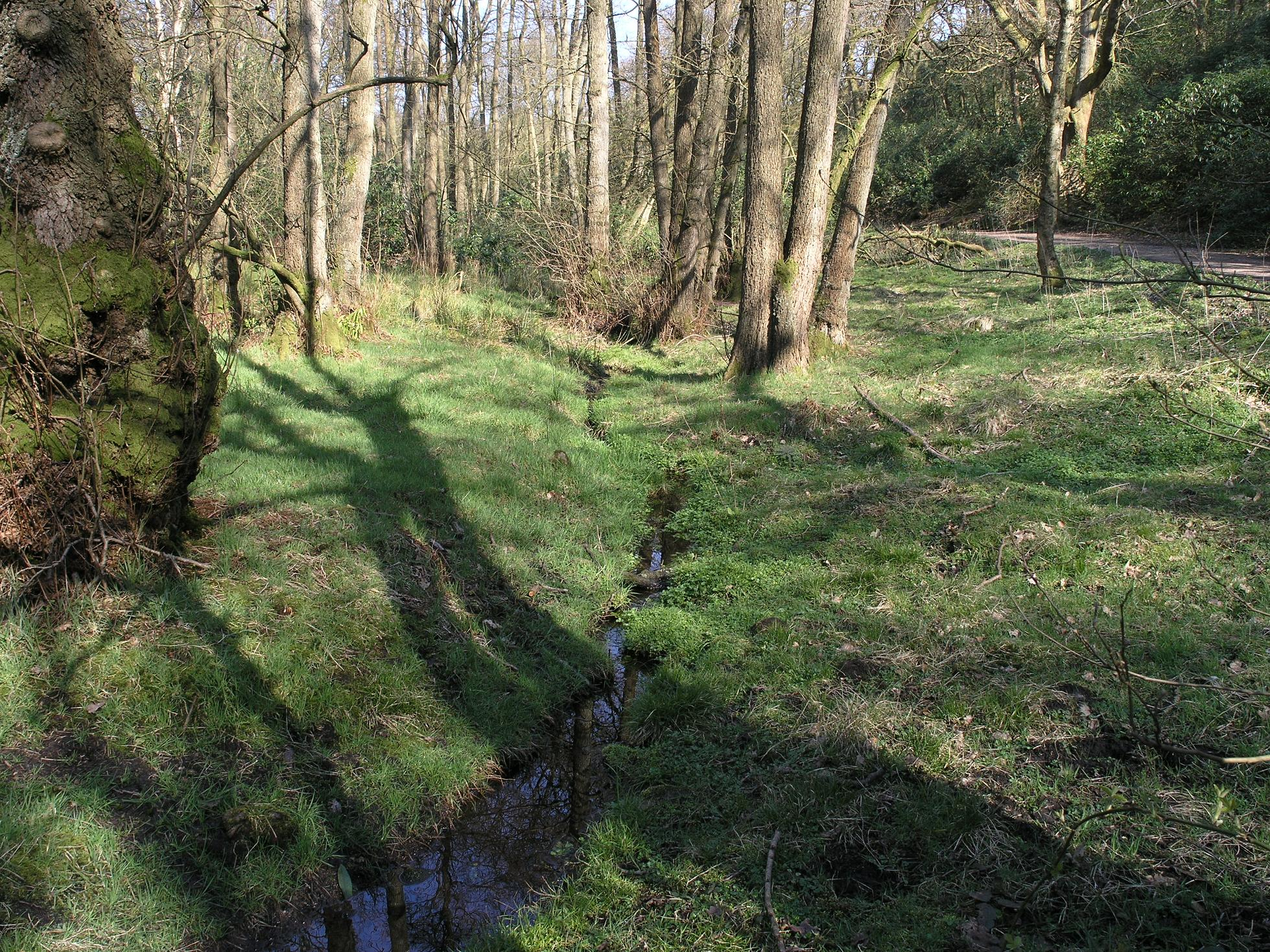
Deciduous woodland habitat

== Distribution ==
Europe East to Siberia, Central Asia, Mongolia, China, Tibet, Korea and Japan. Also in Armenia and the Caucasus. In North America South Canada, Washington, Oregon, North Utah, New Mexico, New Jersey, Ohio, North Carolina.

== Description ==
The wingspan is 40–50 mm. Green, variously tinged with dark green or blackish; a green-tinged cream coloured or whitish blotch between the reniform stigma and outer line; stigmata dark green edged with black; inner and outer lines black, conversely edged with white, or whitish green, or concolorous; hindwing fuscous with a paler fringe. — In jaspidea Bkh. the pale patch beyond the reniform stigma is wanting and the stigmata are blacker; ab. pallida Tutt represents the extreme pale form, the whole wing being whitish green, in which the white patch beyond the reniform is absorbed, and the lines and shades are distinct only in the costal half of wing; — ab. suffusa Tutt is a rare form in which the green tints are superseded by red brown with the area round the stigmata blackish; — in albimacula Hornmz., from the Bukowina, the ground colour is a mixture of dark and light grey, with the patch beyond the reniform clear white, or filled in with grey; — lugubris Petersen from Esthland is dark brownish grey with only slight traces of green or white colouring.

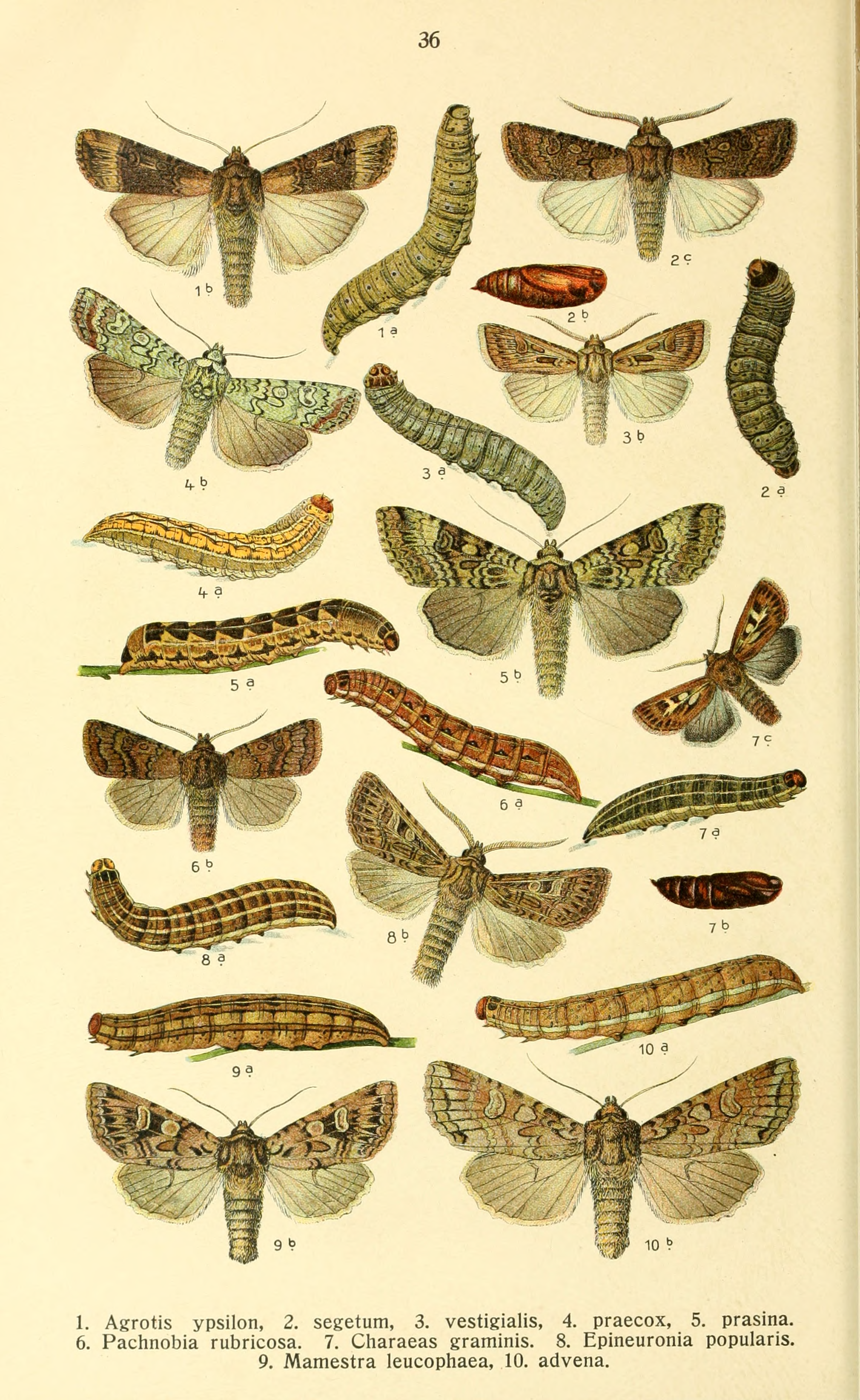
Moth and larva in Karl Eckstein Die Schmetterlinge Deutschlands (figures 5a, 5b)

The moth flies from May to August depending on the location.

The larva is purplish brown, with a pale dorsal line intersecting a row of blackish dorsal blotches; spiracular line pale, with a dark edge above.

The larvae are broad generalists, known to feed on both herbaceous plants and hardwoods. Caterpillars are known to be found on plants including blueberries, hazelnut, maples, and raspberry plants.
