= Paramantis prasina =

Scientific classification
- Kingdom: Animalia
- Phylum: Arthropoda
- Clade: Pancrustacea
- Class: Insecta
- Order: Mantodea
- Family: Mantidae
- Subfamily: Tenoderinae
- Tribe: Paramantini
- Genus: Paramantis
- Species: P. prasina

Binomial name
- Paramantis prasina Audinet-Serville, 1839

Synonyms
- Mantis prasina Serville, 1839; Mantis callifera Wood-Mason, 1882; Mantis emortualis Saussure, 1869

Species of praying mantis

Paramantis prasina is the type species of praying mantis in the genus Paramantis.

== Distribution ==
It is found in Africa south of the Sahara.
