= Eugenia prasina =

Conservation status
- Least Concern (IUCN 3.1)

Scientific classification
- Kingdom: Plantae
- Clade: Tracheophytes
- Clade: Angiosperms
- Clade: Eudicots
- Clade: Rosids
- Order: Myrtales
- Family: Myrtaceae
- Genus: Eugenia
- Species: E. prasina

Binomial name
- Eugenia prasina O.Berg

Synonyms
- Eugenia insipida Mart., nom. illeg. homonym. post.; Eugenia jurujubensis Kiaersk.; Eugenia prasina var. grandifolia Huber; Eugenia stictosepala Kiaersk.

Species of flowering plant

Eugenia prasina is a species of flowering plant in the family Myrtaceae. It is a shrub or tree endemic to eastern, southern, and west-central Brazil.
