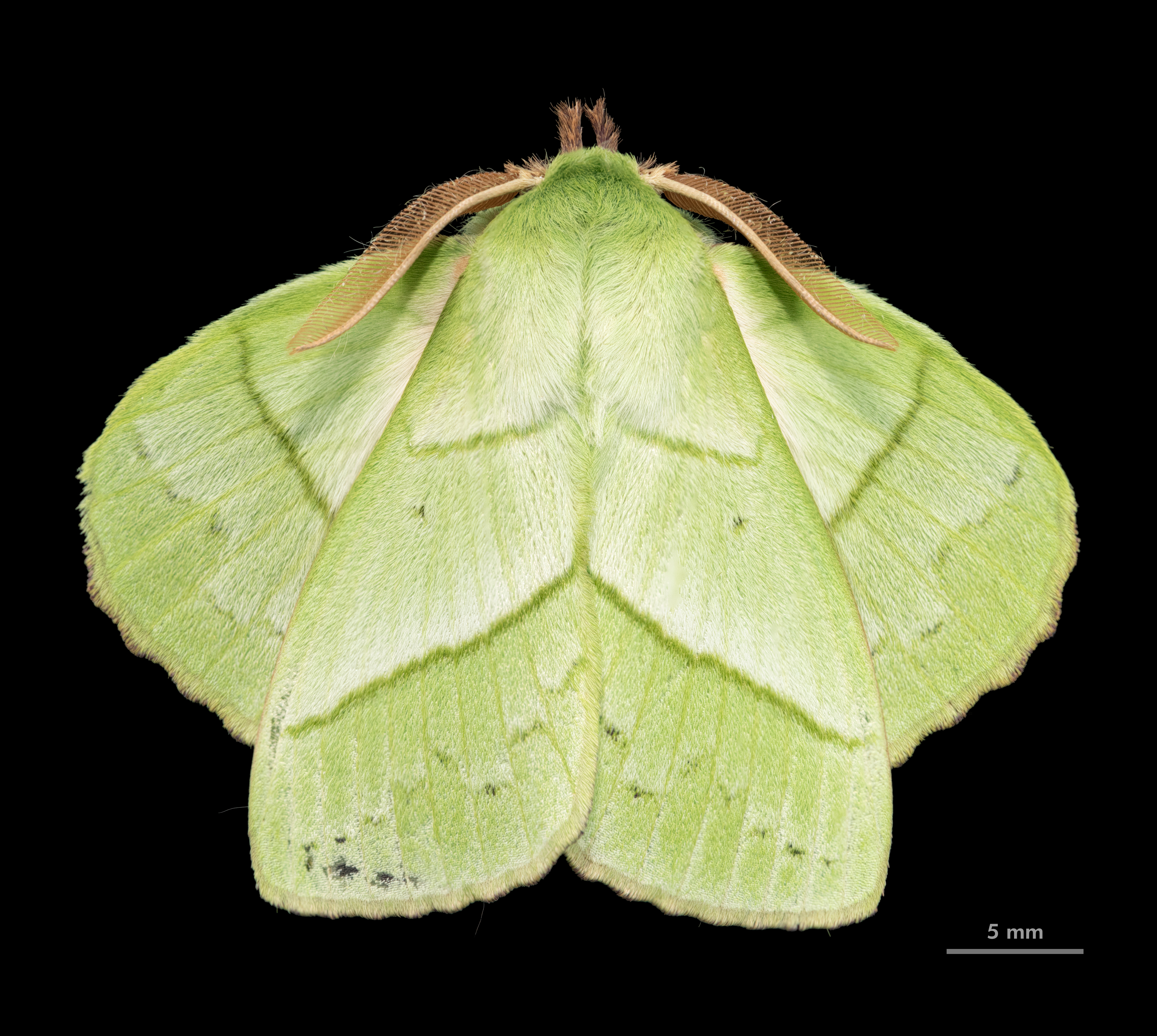
- Male (guttata)
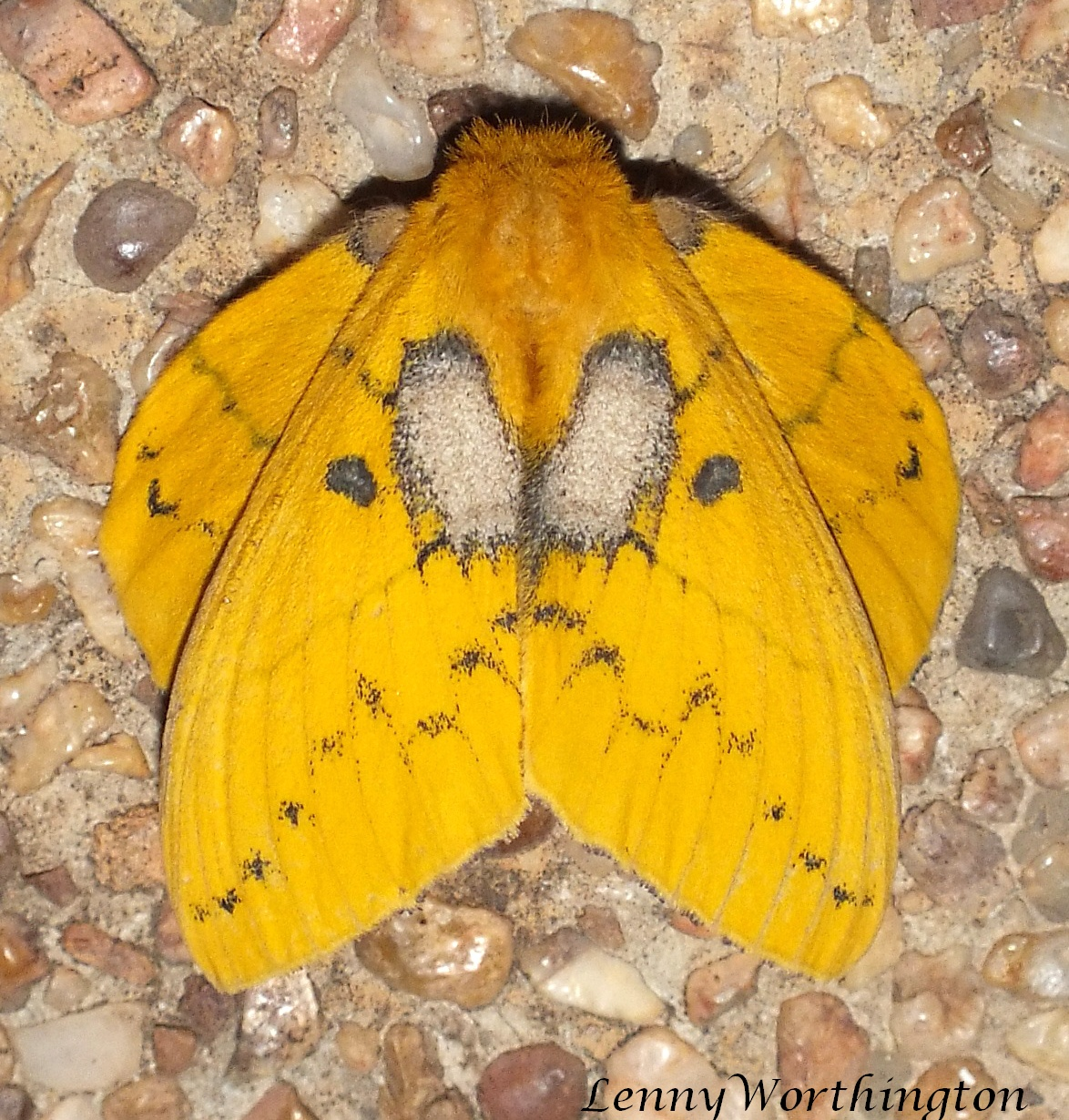
- Female

Scientific classification
- Kingdom: Animalia
- Phylum: Arthropoda
- Clade: Pancrustacea
- Class: Insecta
- Order: Lepidoptera
- Family: Lasiocampidae
- Genus: Trabala
- Species: T. vishnou

Binomial name
- Trabala vishnou (Lefèbvre, 1827)

Synonyms
- Gastropacha vishnou Lefèbvre, 1827; Amydona prasina Walker, 1855

= Trabala vishnou =

Rose-myrtle lappet moth

Species of moth

Trabala vishnou, the rose-myrtle lappet moth, is a species of moth in the family Lasiocampidae. It is found in southern Asia, including Pakistan, India, Bangladesh, Thailand, Sri Lanka, Myanmar, China, Japan, Taiwan, Vietnam, and Indonesia. Four subspecies are recognized.

== Description ==
=== Adult ===
The wingspan is about 67 mm for females and 47 for males. The body colour of the male is apple green. Antennae ochreous brown. The disk of the forewing and the inner margin of the hindwing are whitish. Forewings with a faint pale antemedial line curved below the costa. There is a dark speck at end of cell, and a pale straight oblique postmedial line which becomes medial on the hindwing. Both wings have a series of small submarginal dark spots. The female is yellowish green, which fades to ochreous. Lines and spots of both wings are enlarged and blackish. The spot at the end of the cell of the forewing is large, conspicuous and irrorated (sprinkled) with black scales, and sometimes centered with grey. A reddish-brown patch thickly irrorated with black occupying whole medial inner area from median nervure to inner margin. Cilia of wings are blackish.

=== Immatures ===
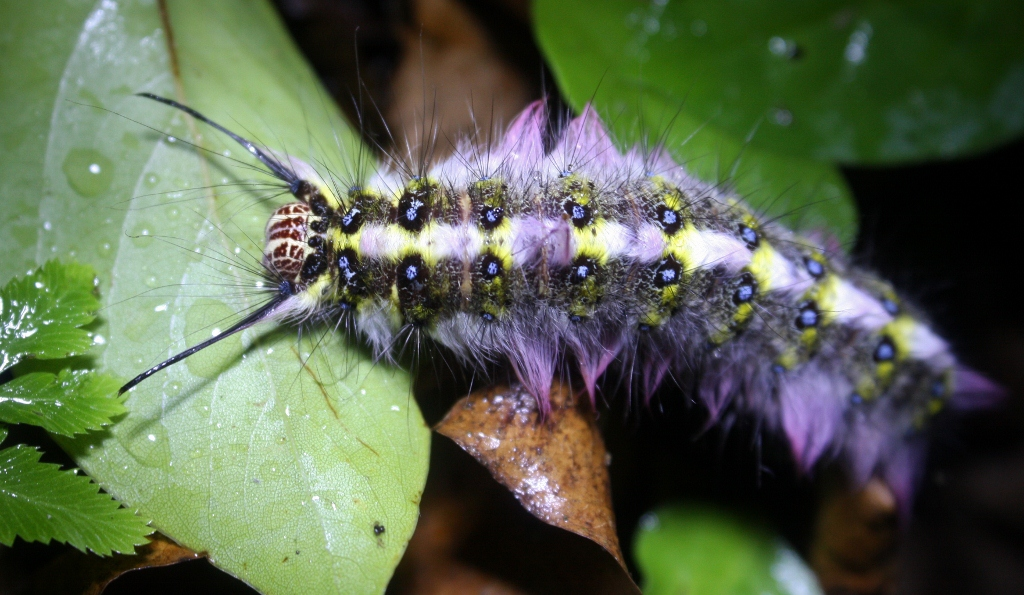
Purplish morph

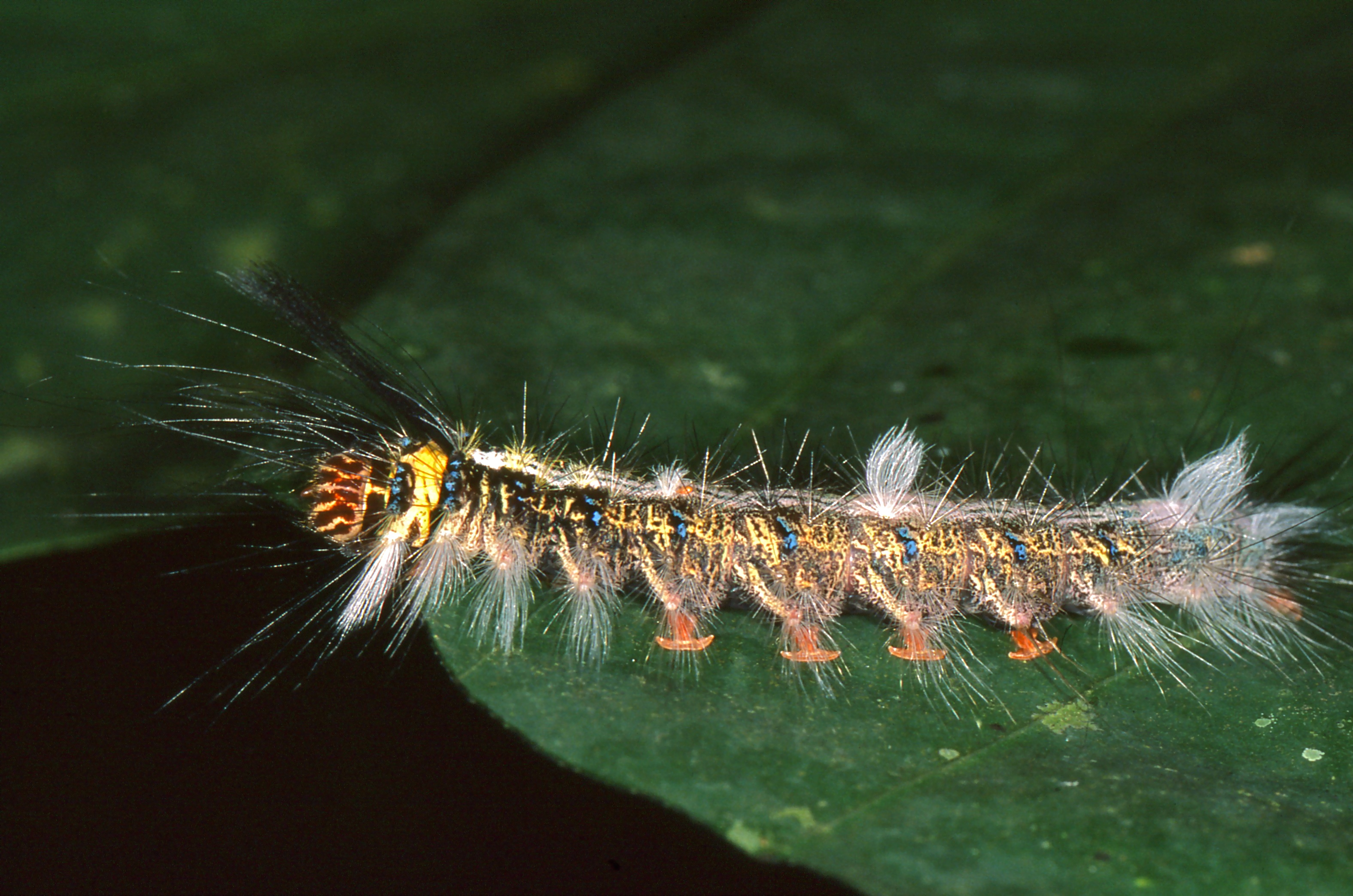
Brownish morph

The larva has a yellow head spotted with red and its body colour is brownish grey with long lateral tufts on each somite. First somite is black and grey, other somites are grey. There are paired dorsal and lateral black spots on each somite, from which spring long black hairs. Spots on the thoracic somites are coalescing. Instead of usual coloured caterpillars, there are two morphs which can be found. Some larvae are blackish with a broad white dorsal stripe, the anterior tufts are reddish brown. The other morph is reddish with blue lateral spots. However, the cocoon is ochreous in all morphs with short black hairs projecting from it, which are intensely irritating.

== Ecology ==
Larvae have been reared on Populus species and also feed on castor, jamun, pomegranate, rose, and sandalwood plants. The braconid wasp, Cotesia trabalae is a known parasitoid of the moth.

== Subspecies ==
- Trabala vishnou gigantina Yang, 1978
- Trabala vishnou guttata (Matsumura, 1909)
- Trabala vishnou singhala Roepke, 1951
- Trabala vishnou vishnou
