= Prasina =

Prasina may refer to:

- Prasina Poulia, one of the oldest football club in Kalamata, Greece
- Crvena prašina (Red Dust), a 1999 Croatian film directed by Zrinko Ogresta
- Dust (2001 film) (Prašina), a 2001 Macedonian film

== Taxonomy ==
- a synonym for Julia, a gastropod genus
