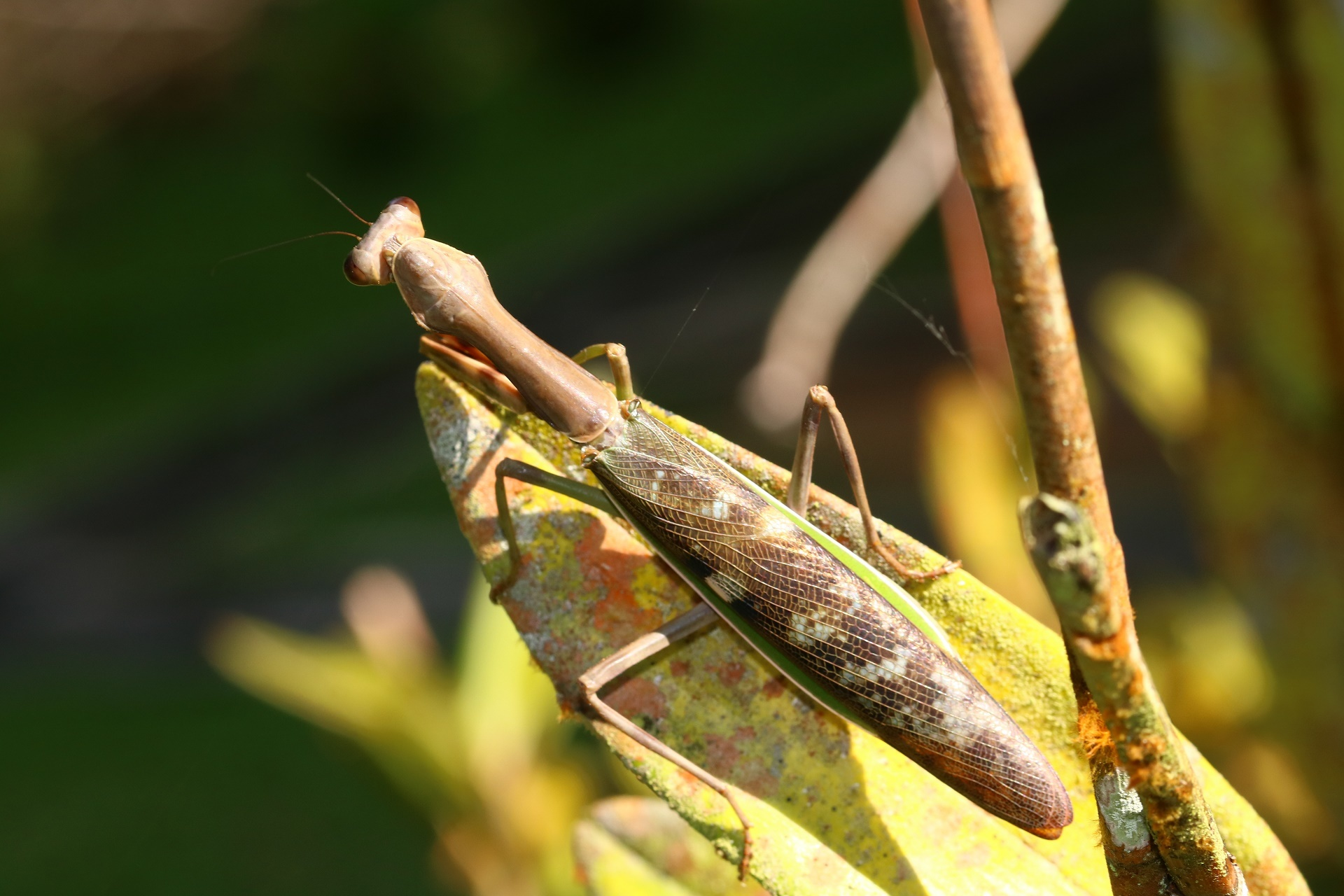

Scientific classification
- Domain: Eukaryota
- Kingdom: Animalia
- Phylum: Arthropoda
- Class: Insecta
- Order: Mantodea
- Family: Mantidae
- Genus: Ephierodula
- Species: E. heteroptera

Binomial name
- Ephierodula heteroptera (Werner, 1906)

Synonyms
- Ephierodula inermis (Werner, 1911); Hierodula inermis Werner, 1911; Hierodula heteroptera Werner, 1906

= Ephierodula heteroptera =

Species of praying mantis in the family Mantidae

Ephierodula heteroptera is a species of praying mantis in the family Mantidae.
