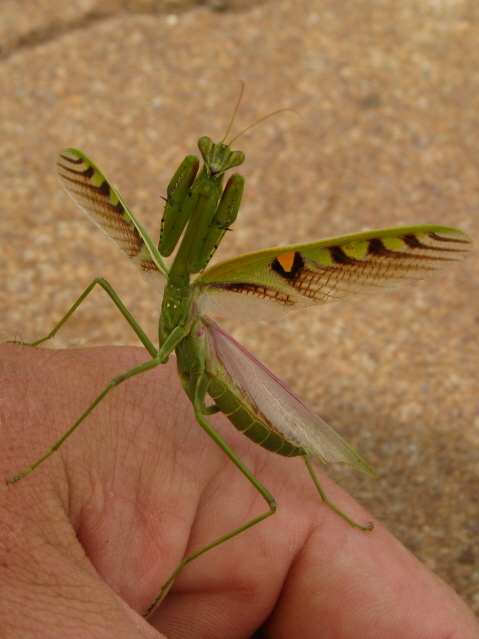

Scientific classification
- Kingdom: Animalia
- Phylum: Arthropoda
- Clade: Pancrustacea
- Class: Insecta
- Order: Mantodea
- Family: Mantidae
- Genus: Omomantis
- Species: O. zebrata

Binomial name
- Omomantis zebrata Charpentier, 1843

= Omomantis zebrata =

Species of insect

Omomantis zebrata, also known by its common name zebra mantis, is a species from the genus Omomantis in the family Mantidae.
