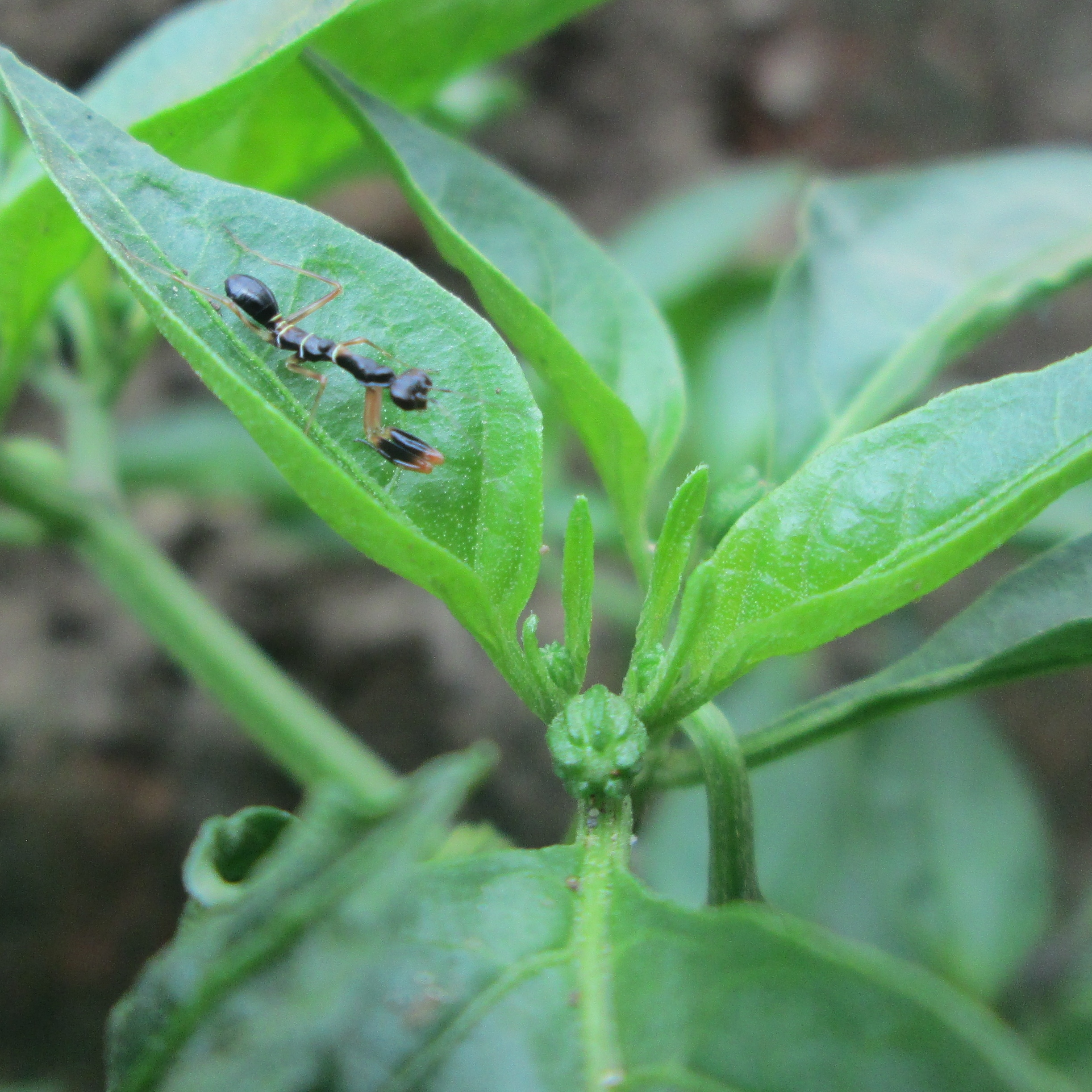

Scientific classification
- Kingdom: Animalia
- Phylum: Arthropoda
- Clade: Pancrustacea
- Class: Insecta
- Order: Mantodea
- Family: Hymenopodidae
- Subfamily: Hymenopodinae
- Tribe: Anaxarchini
- Genus: Odontomantis
- Species: O. planiceps

Binomial name
- Odontomantis planiceps Giglio-Tos, 1913

Synonyms
- Odontomantis javana Saussure, 1870

= Odontomantis planiceps =

Species of praying mantis

Odontomantis planiceps, the Asian ant mantis, is a common species of praying mantis.

== Description ==
Odontomantis planiceps is a small mantis, with adult size ranging from 1.4 cm for males and 2.0 cm for females. It is commonly called the Asian ant mantis because it exhibits batesian mimicry in its juvenile stages, resembling black ants - most notably from the 1st to 3rd instar at which they are most vulnerable from predators.

Odontomantis planiceps is completely black from the 1st to 3rd instar, with green bands at the edges of every thorax segment.

After molting to the 4th instar and up to its ultimate molt, they are mostly green with some variation in color depending on the vegetation in which they reside.

== Distribution ==
Odontomantis planiceps is a very common mantis throughout its range, readily acclimating and even thriving in urban gardens and inhabiting ornamental plants.

The geographic distribution of this mantis is wide, with most specimens collected in the Southeast Asian range from Malaysia to Indonesia, and this species has even been reported in Hong Kong and Taiwan.

== Behaviour ==
Odontomantis planiceps usually stands still on leaves waiting for prey to pass. If there is an assumed threat, it will quickly retreat to the bottom of its leaf, while adult males will not hesitate to fly.

== See also ==
- List of mantis genera and species
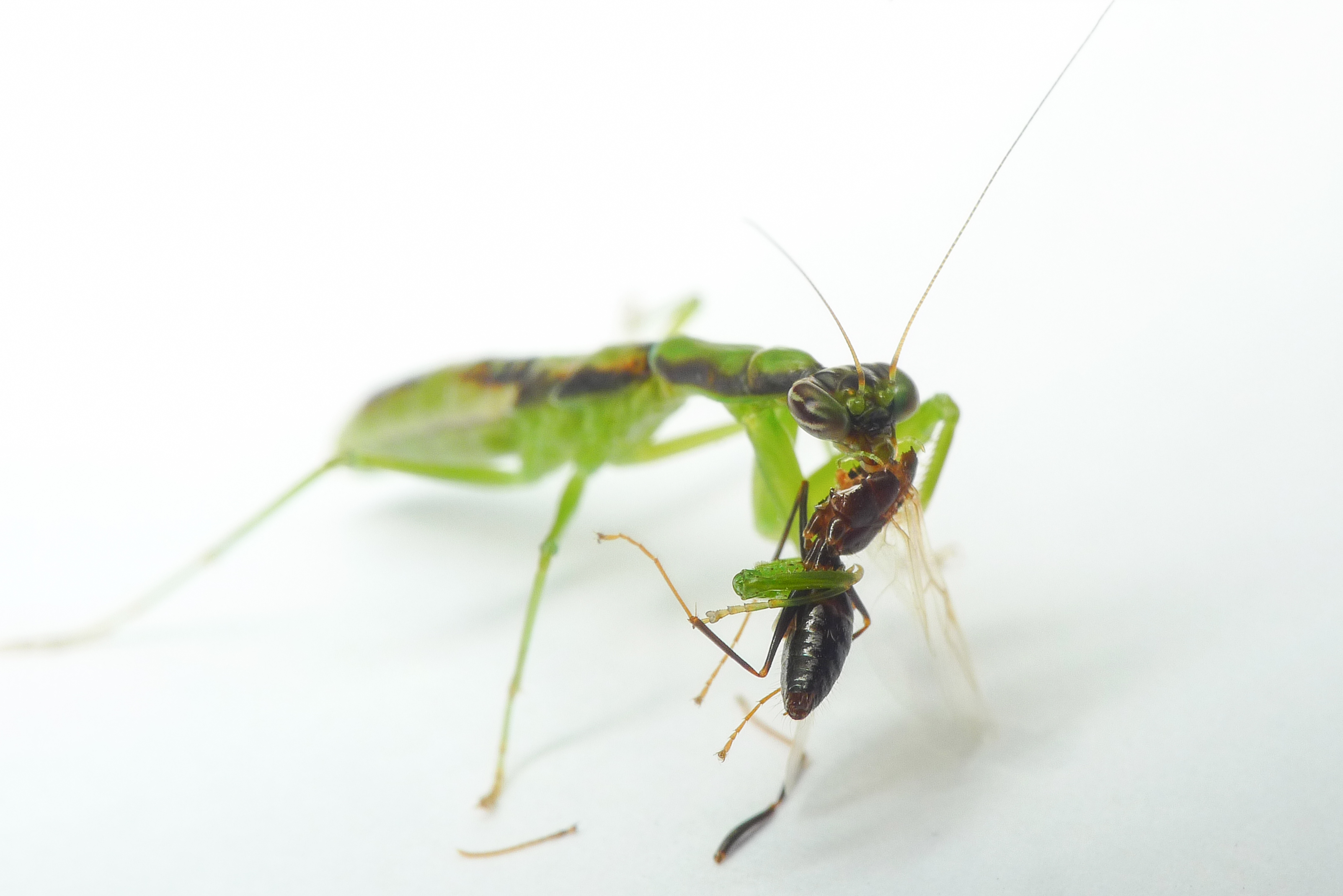
- Odontomantis planiceps subadult exhibiting mottled green coloration after growing out of the juvenile phase.
