= Flower mantis =

Species of mantis camouflaged to resemble flowers to lure their prey

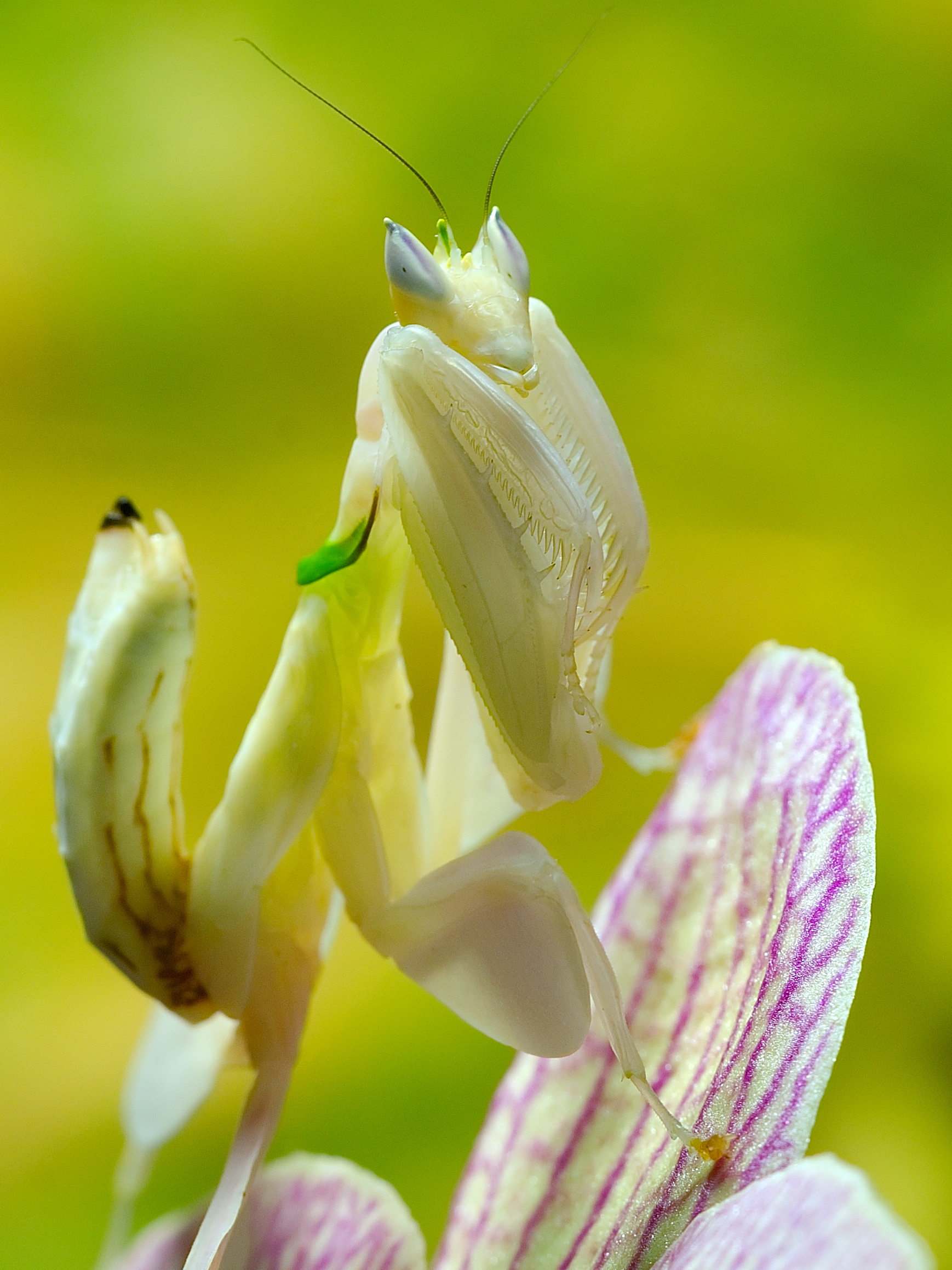
The flower mantises include the orchid mantis, Hymenopus coronatus, which mimics a rainforest orchid of southeast Asia to lure its prey, pollinator insects.

Flower mantises are mantises that use a form of camouflage referred to as aggressive mimicry, which they use both to attract prey and to avoid predators. These insects have specific colorations and behaviors that mimic flowers in their surrounding habitats.

This strategy has been observed in other mantises including the stick mantis and dead-leaf mantis. The observed behavior of these mantises includes positioning themselves on a plant and either inserting themselves within the irradiance or on the foliage of the plants until a prey insect comes within range.

Like other mantises, flower mantises use their raptorial forelegs to catch pray, but they are found to also use these to avert and deflect predator attack. This is not a universal behavior of mantises and is only identified in certain lineages of mantids.

Many species of flower mantises are popular as pets. The flower mantises are a diurnal group with a single ancestor (a clade), but the majority of the known species belong to the family Hymenopodidae.

== Example species: Orchid mantis ==
The orchid mantis, Hymenopus coronatus, of southeast Asia mimics orchid flowers. There is no evidence that suggests that they mimic a specific orchid, but their bodies are often white with pink markings and green eyes. These insects display different body morphologies depending on their life stage; juveniles are able to bend their abdomens upwards, allowing them to easily resemble a flower. However, the adult's wings are too large, inhibiting their ability to bend as the juveniles do. This dichotomy suggests that there must be other processes involved to attract insect prey species. Since Hymenopus coronatus do not mimic one orchid in particular, their colorations often do not match the coloration of a single orchid species.

=== Antipredator behaviour ===
One mechanism displayed by the orchid mantis to attract prey is the ability to absorb UV light the same way that flowers do. This makes the mantis appear flower-like to UV-sensitive insects who are often pollinators. To an insect, the mantis and the surrounding flowers appear blue; this contrasts against the foliage in the background that appears red.

In his 1940 book Adaptive Coloration in Animals, Hugh Cott quotes an account by Nelson Annandale, saying that the mantis hunts on the flowers of the "Straits Rhododendron", Melastoma polyanthum. The nymph has what Cott calls "special alluring coloration" (aggressive mimicry), where the animal itself is the "decoy". The insect is pink and white, with flattened limbs with "that semiopalescent, semicrystalline appearance that is caused in flower petals by a purely structural arrangement of liquid globules or empty cells". The mantis climbs up the twigs of the plant and stands imitating a flower and waits for its prey patiently. It then sways from side to side, and soon small flies land on and around it, attracted by the small black spot on the end of its abdomen, which resembles a fly. When a larger dipteran fly, as big as a house fly, landed nearby, the mantis at once seized and ate it. More recently (2015), the orchid mantis's coloration has been shown to mimic tropical flowers effectively, attracting pollinators and catching them.

Juvenile mantises secrete a mixture of the chemicals 3HOA and 10HDA, attracting their top prey species, the oriental bumblebee. This method of deception is aggressive chemical mimicry, imitating the chemical composition of the bee's pheromones. The chemicals are stored in the mandibles and released when H. coronatus is hunting. Adult mantises do not produce these chemicals.

== Taxonomic range ==
The flower mantises include species from several genera, many of which are popularly kept as pets. Seven of the genera are in the Hymenopodidae:

- Mantodea
  - Mantidea
    - Hymenopodidae
      - Acromantinae
        - Acromantis
      - Hymenopodinae
        - - Hymenopodina
            - Hymenopus
            - Helvia
            - Theopropus
          - Pseudocreobotrina
            - Creobroter
            - Chloroharpax
            - Pseudocreobotra
    - Empusidae
      - Blepharodinae
        - Blepharopsis
      - Empusini
        - Gongylus
        - Idolomantis
  - Galinthiadidae
    - Harpagomantis
    - Pseudoharpax

Flower mantises
| Species | Common names | Image | Distribution | Notes |
|---|---|---|---|---|
| Acromantis formosana | Taiwan flower mantis | | Taiwan | Nymphs are dark brown, flanged and spined, highly cryptic on dead leaves. Adults have green wings. |
| Blepharopsis mendica | Small devil's flower mantis Devil's flower mantis Thistle mantis Egyptian flower mantis Arab mantis | | North Africa, Canary Islands | Deimatic display with head and thorax rotated to one side. |
| Chloroharpax modesta | Nigerian flower mantis | | West Africa | Adult female has ocellated eyespots on wings. Aggressively hunts prey larger than itself. |
| Creobroter gemmatus and other species in genus Creobroter | Flower mantises | | South and Southeast Asia | Fly strongly on long wings. Eyespots on forewings, varying colours. Deimatic display of bright hindwings is flashed to startle predators. |
| Gongylus gongylodes | Wandering violin mantis Ornate mantis Indian rose mantis | | South Asia | Up to 11 cm; males can fly. |
| Harpagomantis tricolor | African false flower mantis | | Southern Africa | A colourful ambush hunter that waits motionless on flowering plants. Length about 3 cm. |
| Hymenopus coronatus | Orchid mantis Walking flower mantis | | Southeast Asia | Hunts flies on "Straits Rhododendron", Melastoma polyanthum. |
| Idolomantis diabolica | [Giant] devil's flower mantis | | Central and East Africa | Large insect, females as much as 13 cm. Brightly coloured deimatic display in red, white, blue, purple and black. |
| Helvia cardinalis (="Parymenopus davisoni") | Yellow flower mantis, Davison's mantis | | Southeast Asia | A slender yellow mantis, the female with three dark spots on the wings |
| Pseudoharpax virescens | Gambian spotted-eye flower mantis | | East, Central, and West Africa | Adult female has eye spots on her abdomen. |
| Pseudocreobotra wahlbergii | Spiny flower mantis Bulls-eye mantis #9 mantis | | South and East Africa | Effective aggressive mimic of flowers, can handle prey much larger than itself, deimatic display with spread wings to show off "number 9" eyespots, variable coloration |
| Pseudocreobotra ocellata | Spiny flower mantis Spiny flower praying mantis African ocellated mantis | | West, Central and Southern Africa | Like P. wahlbergii. |
| Theopropus elegans | Banded flower mantis Asian boxer mantis | | Southeast Asia | White stripe on forewings. Colours can vary. |

== See also ==
- List of mantis genera and species
