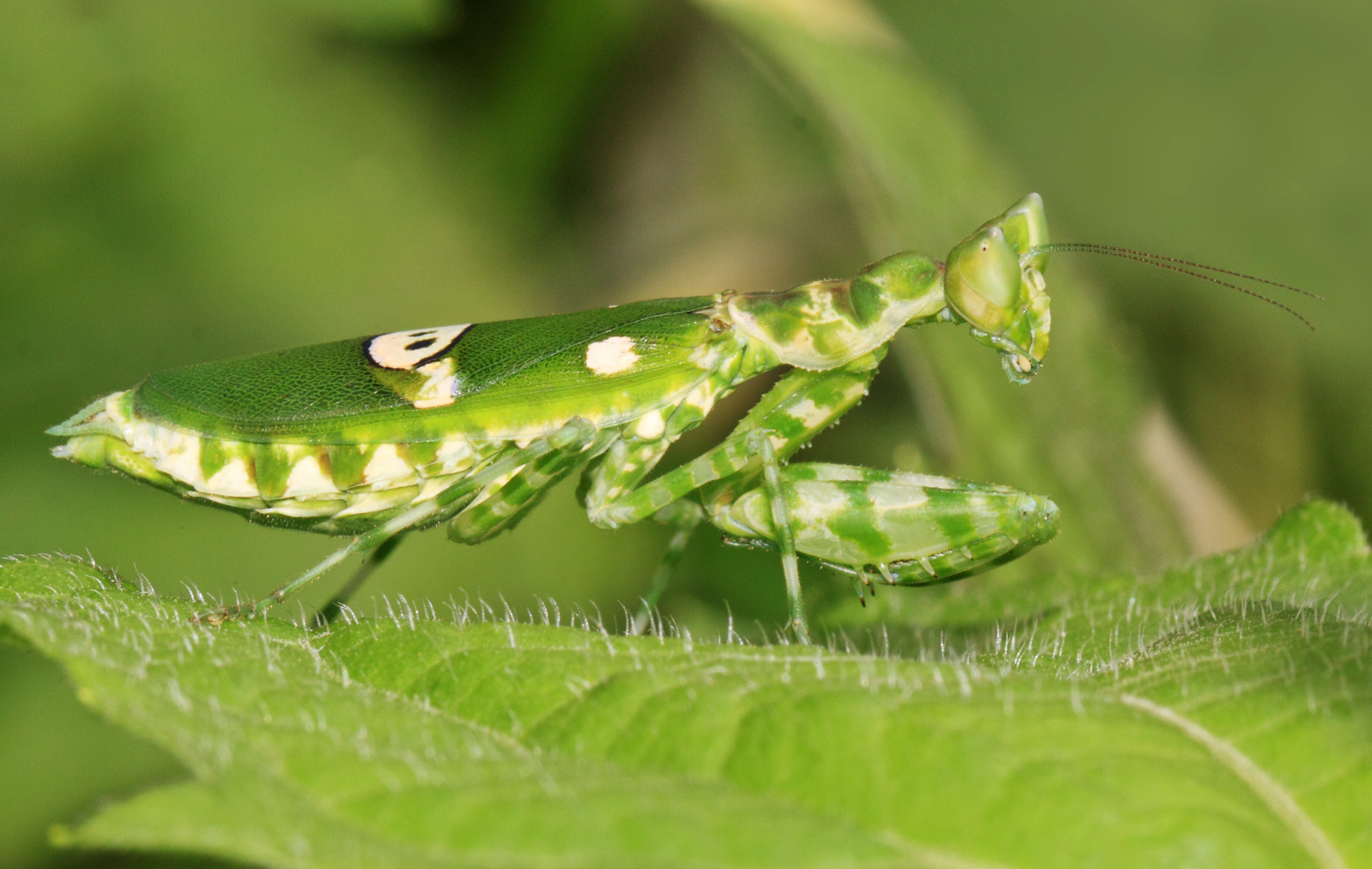
- Adult female Creobroter sp (species unknown. 4-5cm in length) from West Java

Scientific classification
- Kingdom: Animalia
- Phylum: Arthropoda
- Clade: Pancrustacea
- Class: Insecta
- Order: Mantodea
- Family: Hymenopodidae
- Subfamily: Hymenopodinae; Giglio-Tos, 1919

Tribes
- Anaxarchini; Hymenopodini

= Hymenopodinae =

Subfamily of praying mantises

Hymenopodinae is a subfamily of the mantis family Hymenopodidae that includes several species of flower mantises.

== Tribes and genera ==
The Mantodea Species File lists genera in two tribes:

=== Anaxarchini ===
- Anaxarcha Stal, 1877
- Euantissa Giglio-Tos, 1927
- Heliomantis Giglio-Tos, 1915
- Nemotha Wood-Mason, 1884
- Odontomantis Saussure, 1871
- Werneriana Shcherbakov, Ehrmann & Borer, 2016 - monotypic W. latipennis (Werner, 1930)

=== Hymenopodini ===
subtribe Hymenopodina

- Helvia (Stal, 1877) (synonym: Parymenopus (Wood-Mason, 1890))
- Hymenopus (Serville, 1831)
- Theopropus (Saussure, 1898)

subtribe Pseudocreobotrina

- Chlidonoptera (Karsch, 1892)
- Chloroharpax (Werner, 1908)
- Creobroter (Westwood, 1889)
- Panurgica (Karsch, 1896)
- Pseudocreobotra (Saussure, 1870)

=== Now placed in family Galinthiadidae ===
- Galinthias (Stal, 1877) (synonym Attalia (Uvarov, 1936))
- Harpagomantis (Kirby, 1899)
- Pseudoharpax (Saussure, 1870)

== See also ==
- List of mantis genera and species
- Media related to Hymenopodinae at Wikimedia Commons
- Data related to Hymenopodinae at Wikispecies
