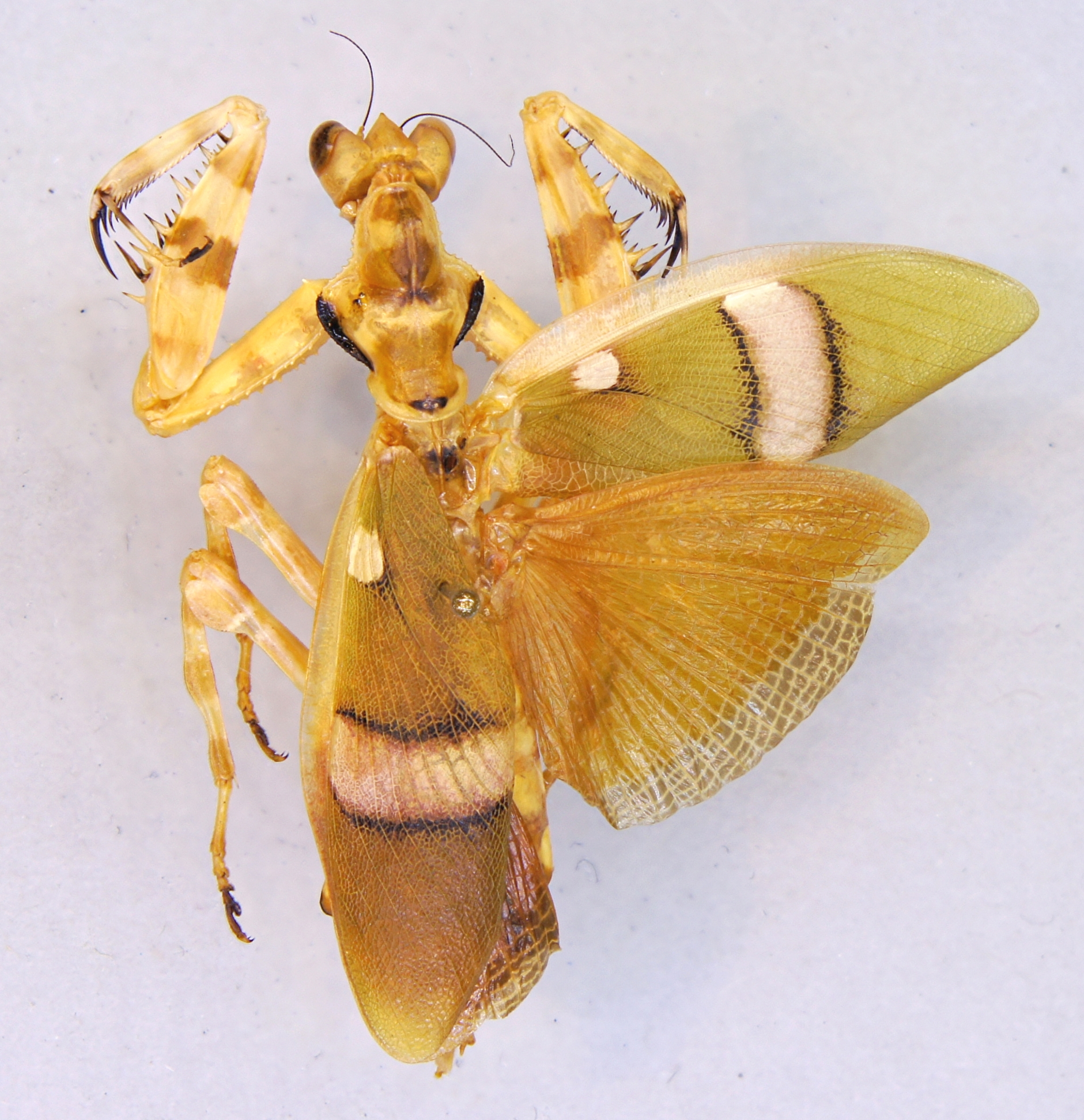
- Female at Zoologische Staatssammlung München

Scientific classification
- Kingdom: Animalia
- Phylum: Arthropoda
- Clade: Pancrustacea
- Class: Insecta
- Order: Mantodea
- Family: Hymenopodidae
- Genus: Theopropus
- Species: T. elegans

Binomial name
- Theopropus elegans Westwood, 1832

Synonyms
- Theopropus flavicans Giglio-Tos, 1927; Theopropus praecontatrix Saussure, 1898

= Theopropus elegans =

Species of praying mantis

Theopropus elegans, common name banded flower mantis, is a species of praying mantis native to Southeast Asia.

Until their first moult, nymphs have red and black exoskeletons that aid them in ant mimicry. They are green and white starting at their second instar, and adults are similar in size and appearance to Creobroter species. Adult females are up to 5 cm in length, while males only grow to 3 cm long, due to the sexual dimorphism common in mantises. Both sexes have green and white spots with bright orange hind wings and a large, white, transverse stripe on the forewings.

Individuals of T. elegans hatched from a single ootheca and reared under the same conditions can show color variation between red, green, and yellow tones. Individuals can also change their color in as little as a week.

== See also ==
- List of mantis genera and species
- Flower mantis
