= Pachymantis dohertyi =

Scientific classification
- Kingdom: Animalia
- Phylum: Arthropoda
- Clade: Pancrustacea
- Class: Insecta
- Order: Mantodea
- Family: Hymenopodidae
- Genus: Pachymantis
- Species: P. dohertyi

Binomial name
- Pachymantis dohertyi Wood-Mason, 1890

Species of praying mantis

Pachymantis dohertyi is a species of praying mantis native to Perak in Malaysia.
