= Pachymantis bicingulata =

Scientific classification
- Kingdom: Animalia
- Phylum: Arthropoda
- Clade: Pancrustacea
- Class: Insecta
- Order: Mantodea
- Family: Hymenopodidae
- Genus: Pachymantis
- Species: P. bicingulata

Binomial name
- Pachymantis bicingulata de Haan, 1842

Species of praying mantis

Pachymantis bicingulata is a species of praying mantis found in Malaysia, Sumatra, Java, and Borneo.
