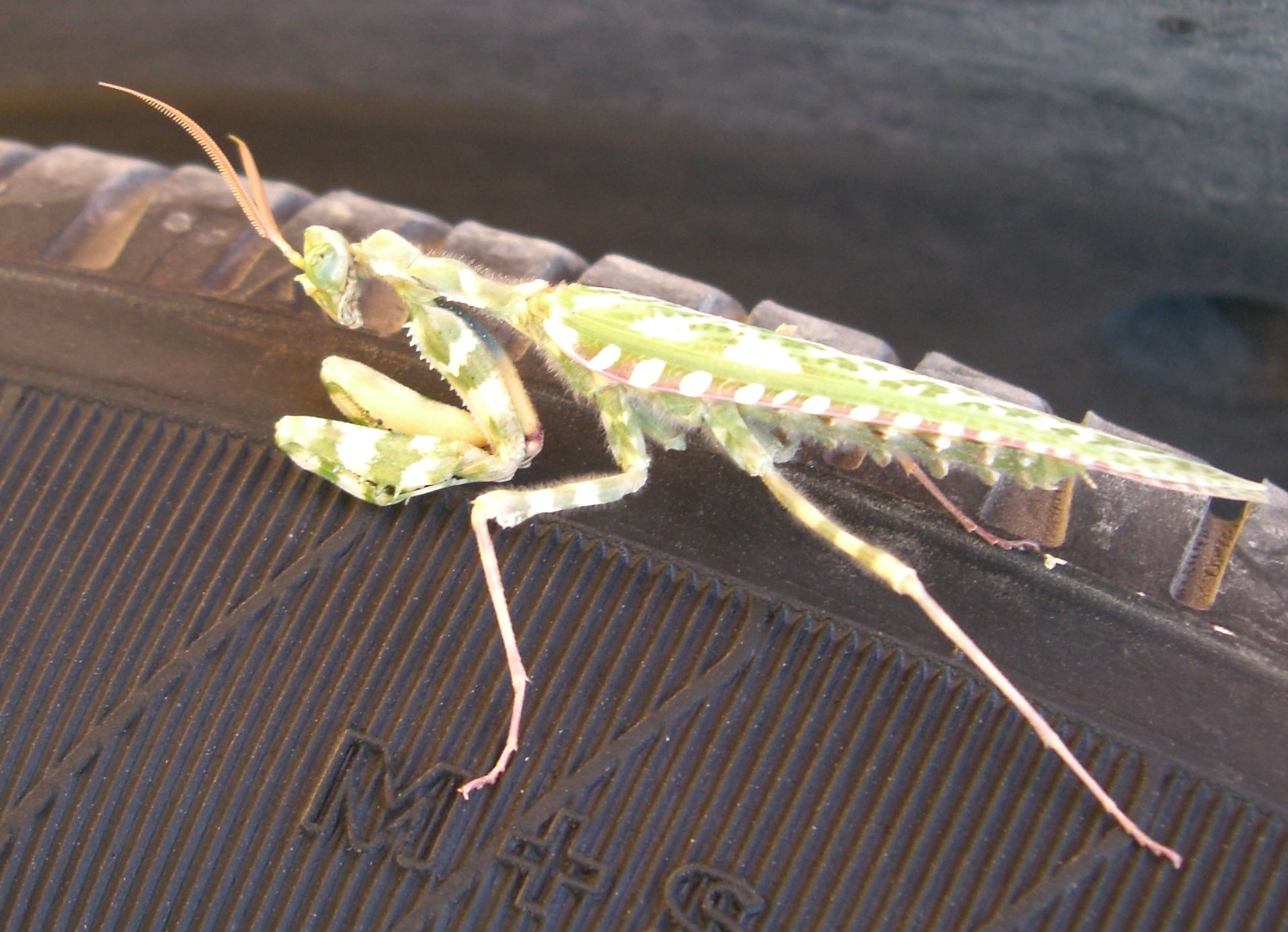
- B. mendica on a tyre of a car

Scientific classification
- Kingdom: Animalia
- Phylum: Arthropoda
- Clade: Pancrustacea
- Class: Insecta
- Order: Mantodea
- Family: Empusidae
- Subfamily: Blepharodinae
- Genus: Blepharopsis; Rehn, 1902
- Species: B. mendica

Binomial name
- Blepharopsis mendica (Fabricius, 1775)

Subspecies
- See text

Synonyms
- Mantis mendica Fabricius, 1775

= Blepharopsis =

Species of praying mantis

Blepharopsis mendica is a species of praying mantis found in North Africa, parts of the Mediterranean, Middle East and southern Asia, and on the Canary Islands, and the sole member of the genus Blepharopsis. Egyptian flower mantis, thistle mantis, and Arab mantis are among its common names.

In deimatic display, the adult rotates its head and thorax to one side, displaying the bright colours on the insides of its forelegs and the undersides of its hindwings, and holds its wings slightly spread behind the body, making it seem large and threatening.

== Range ==
Its range includes Afghanistan, Egypt, Algeria, Ethiopia, India, Iran, Israel, Jordan, Canary Islands, Libya, Lebanon, Morocco, Mauritania, Niger, Oman, Pakistan, Somalia, Sudan, Tschad, Tunisia, Turkey, and Cyprus.

== Habitat ==
This species lives in terrestrial areas like herbaceous vegetation and spiny bushes. Their color makes them well suited for mimicry of leaves, spiny or dry bushes, and vegetation in deserts due to their coloration.

== Subspecies ==
- Blepharopsis mendica mendica (Fabricius, 1775)
- Blepharopsis mendica nuda (Giglio-Tos, 1917) Ethiopia, Arabia, Yemen, Israel, Palestine, Somalia

== See also ==
- Flower mantis
- List of mantis genera and species
