= Heliomantis =

Scientific classification
- Kingdom: Animalia
- Phylum: Arthropoda
- Clade: Pancrustacea
- Class: Insecta
- Order: Mantodea
- Family: Hymenopodidae
- Genus: Heliomantis; Giglio-Tos, 1915
- Species: H. elegans

Binomial name
- Heliomantis elegans (Navás, 1904)

Synonyms
- (Genus): Deiroharpax Werner, 1916; Paraspilota Bolivar, 1913; (Species): Polyspilota elegans Navás, 1904 (type species); Heliomantis viridis Werner, 1916

Genus of praying mantises

Heliomantis is an Asian genus of praying mantids in the family Hymenopodidae, subfamily Hymenopodinae. The genus is monotypic.

== Species ==
The genus contains only one valid species:

- Heliomantis elegans (Navás, 1904) (lectotype: NE India & Nepal; also recorded in Bhutan)

=== Reassigned ===
Heliomantis latipennis Werner, 1930 from Sarawak, Borneo, has been transferred to the new genus Werneriana due to its "highly divergent morphology".

== Description ==
Males measure 32–37 mm (1.3–1.5 in) and females 47–54 mm (1.9–2.1 in) in total length. Living specimens are predominantly green in color. The head is triangular. The pronotum is moderately lender. The forelegs are typical of praying mantises. The abdomen is wide; the wings far surpass the end of abdomen.

== Habitat ==
Heliomantis latipennis appears to prefer mountain forests and has been recorded at elevations of 1,600–2,150 m (5,250–7,050 ft) above sea level.
