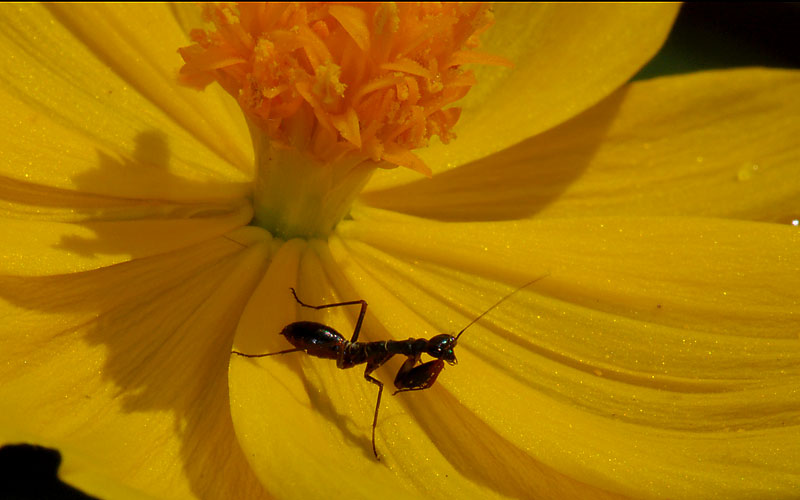

Scientific classification
- Kingdom: Animalia
- Phylum: Arthropoda
- Clade: Pancrustacea
- Class: Insecta
- Order: Mantodea
- Family: Hymenopodidae
- Tribe: Anaxarchini
- Genus: Odontomantis; Saussure, 1871

Synonyms
- Antissa Stal, 1871; Euantissa Giglio-Tos, 1927

= Odontomantis =

Genus of mantises

Odontomantis is a genus of mantids in the family Hymenopodidae; species can be found in tropical Asia.

== Species ==
The Mantodea Species File lists:

- Odontomantis brachyptera Zheng, 1989
- Odontomantis buhleri Beier, 1952
- Odontomantis chayuensis Zheng, 1989
- Odontomantis euphrosyne Stal, 1877
- Odontomantis foveafrons Zhang, 1985
- Odontomantis hainana Tinkham, 1937
- Odontomantis laticollis Beier, 1933
- Odontomantis longipennis Zheng, 1989
- Odontomantis micans Saussure, 1871
- Odontomantis montana Giglio-Tos, 1915
- Odontomantis monticola Beier, 1933
- Odontomantis nigrimarginalis Zhang, 1985
- Odontomantis ornata Werner, 1935
- Odontomantis parva Giglio-Tos, 1915
- Odontomantis planiceps Haan, 1842; synonym O. javana Saussure, 1870
- Odontomantis pulchra Olivier, 1792; synonyms O. caffraria Lichtenstein, 1802; O. flavicincta Olivier, 1792; O. marginalis Stoll, 1813
- Odontomantis rhyssa Werner, 1930
- Odontomantis sinensis Giglio-Tos, 1915
- Odontomantis xizangensis Zheng, 1989

== Gallery ==
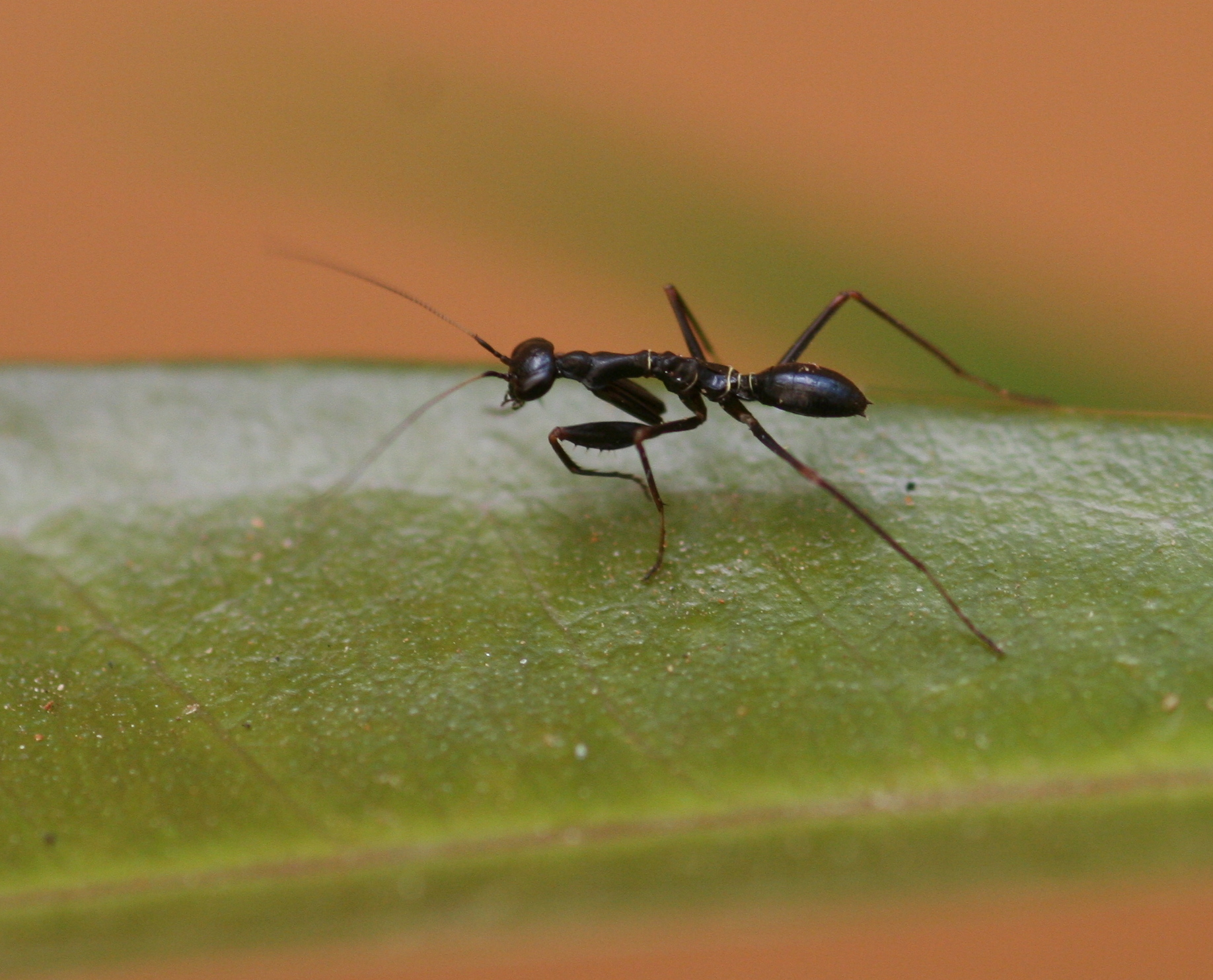

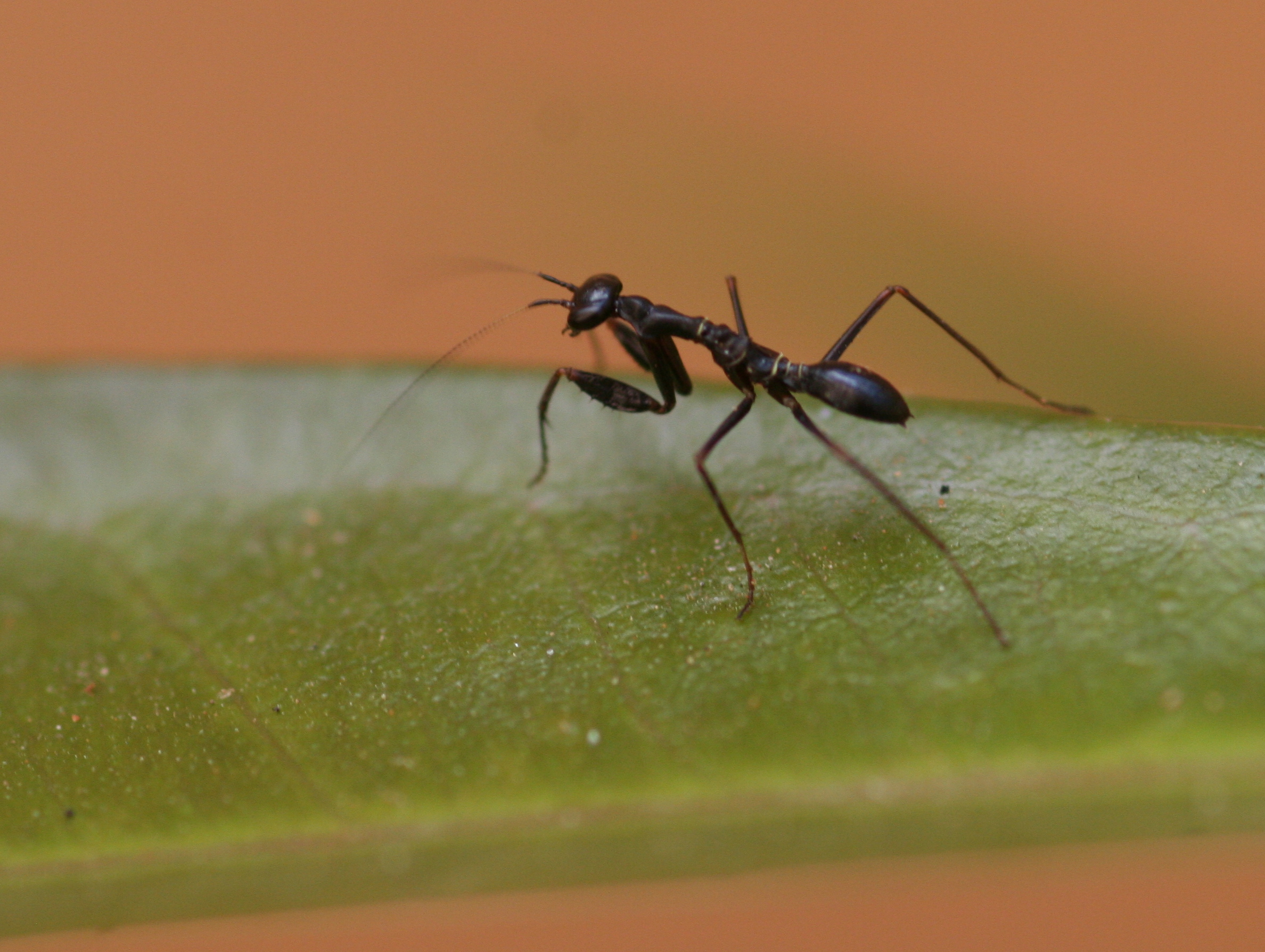
