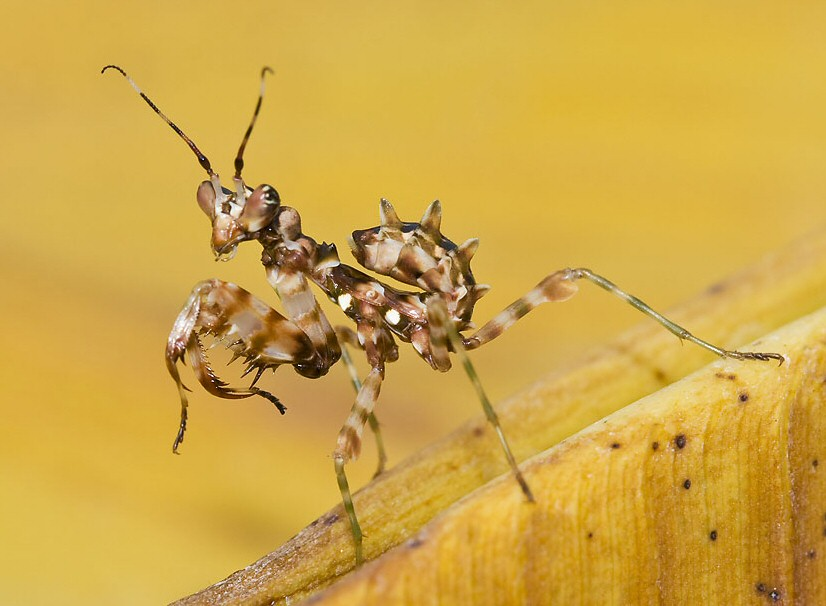
- Spiny flower mantis nymph

Scientific classification
- Kingdom: Animalia
- Phylum: Arthropoda
- Clade: Pancrustacea
- Class: Insecta
- Order: Mantodea
- Family: Hymenopodidae
- Genus: Pseudocreobotra
- Species: P. ocellata

Binomial name
- Pseudocreobotra ocellata Palisot, 1805

Synonyms
- Pseudocreobotra ocellaria Drury, 1773

= Pseudocreobotra ocellata =

Species of praying mantis

Pseudocreobotra ocellata, known as the African flower mantis or with other species as the spiny flower mantis, is a flower mantis (40 mm or 1 1/2 in) native to Africa, ranging from Angola and South Africa in the south to Uganda in the east and Senegal in the west. It was described by the French naturalist Palisot de Beauvois in 1805.

== Description ==
The adult has bold disruptive coloration in cream and green, providing effective camouflage against flowers and in damp leafy places. The male reaches 25 mm long, the female 32 mm. There are spiny projections under the abdomen, 6 in the male, 5 in the female. The wings of the male are longer and wider than the abdomen, while the female's wings are narrower than the abdomen and can only briefly sustain flight.

== Behaviour and ecology ==
The wings of P. ocellata, like those of Pseudocreobotra wahlbergii, are marked with a large brightly coloured eyespot which is used in deimatic display to startle predators. The adults are aggressive mimics of flowers, waiting until prey approaches to grasp it with their forelegs.

== See also ==
- List of mantis genera and species
- Flower mantis
