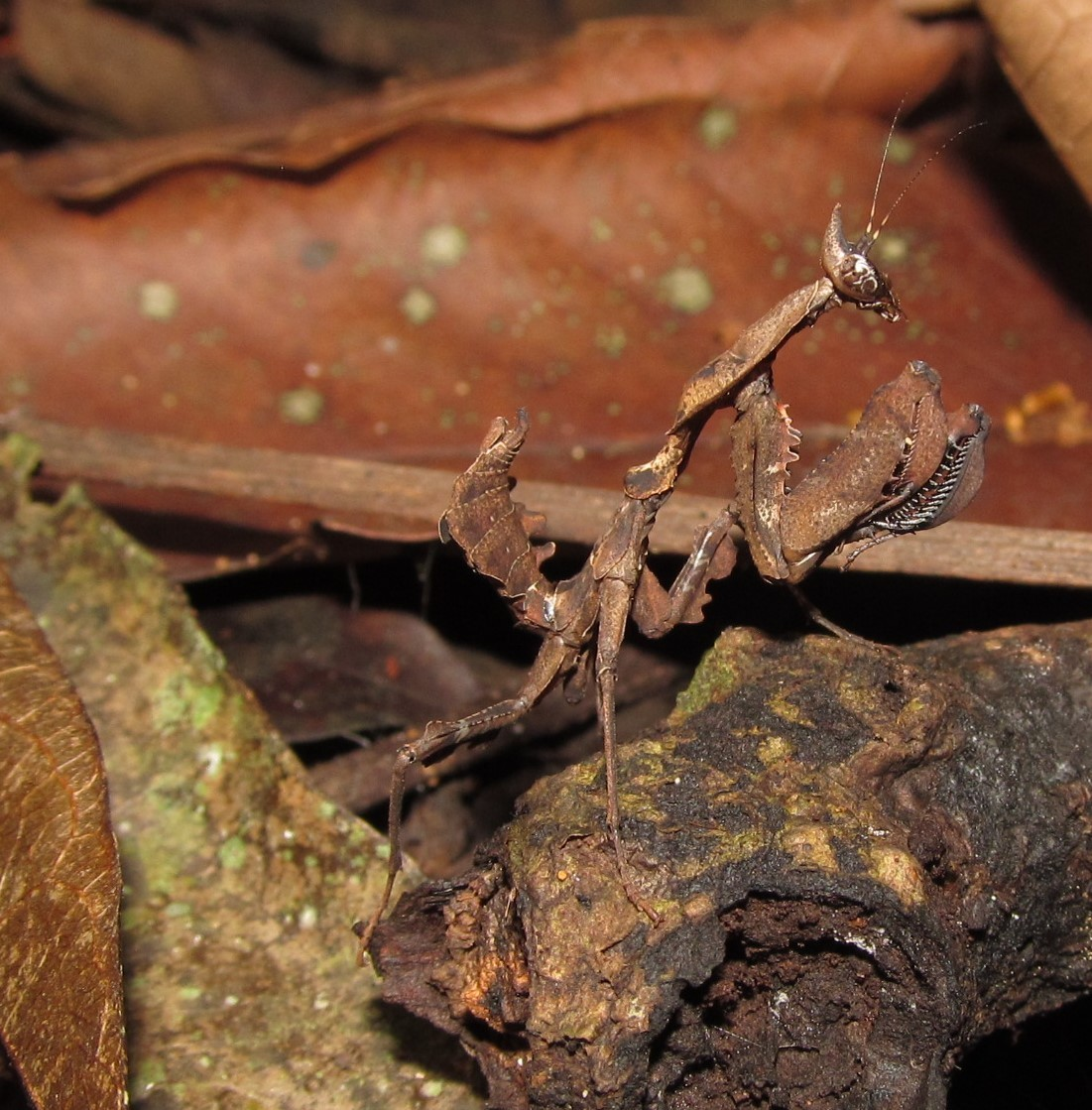
- Parablepharis asiatica

Scientific classification
- Kingdom: Animalia
- Phylum: Arthropoda
- Clade: Pancrustacea
- Class: Insecta
- Order: Mantodea
- Family: Hymenopodidae
- Subfamily: Phyllothelyinae
- Genus: Parablepharis; Saussure, 1870

= Parablepharis =

Genus of praying mantises

Parablepharis is a genus of praying mantises in the family Hymenopodidae.They are found in India, Thailand, Myanmar, Vietnam, Borneo, Java and Yunnan, China.

== Species ==
The Mantodea Species File lists:

- Parablepharis kuhlii (de Haan, 1842)
- Parablepharis asiatica (Roy, 2008)
- Parablepharis indica Binoy & Sureshan, 2026
