= Nemotha =

Nemotha metallica

Scientific classification
- Kingdom: Animalia
- Phylum: Arthropoda
- Clade: Pancrustacea
- Class: Insecta
- Order: Mantodea
- Family: Hymenopodidae
- Subfamily: Hymenopodinae
- Tribe: Anaxarchini
- Genus: Nemotha; Wood-Mason, 1884
- Species: N. metallica

Binomial name
- Nemotha metallica Westwood, 1845

Synonyms
- Mantis metallica Westwood, 1845; Micromantis metallica Saussure, 1871

Genus of praying mantises

Nemotha is a genus of praying mantids in the family Hymenopodidae: tribe Anaxarchini, containing a single described species, Nemotha metallica. The genus was previously placed in the Iridopterygidae, and two species have been placed in the revived genus Tricondylomimus. It is found in Asia.
