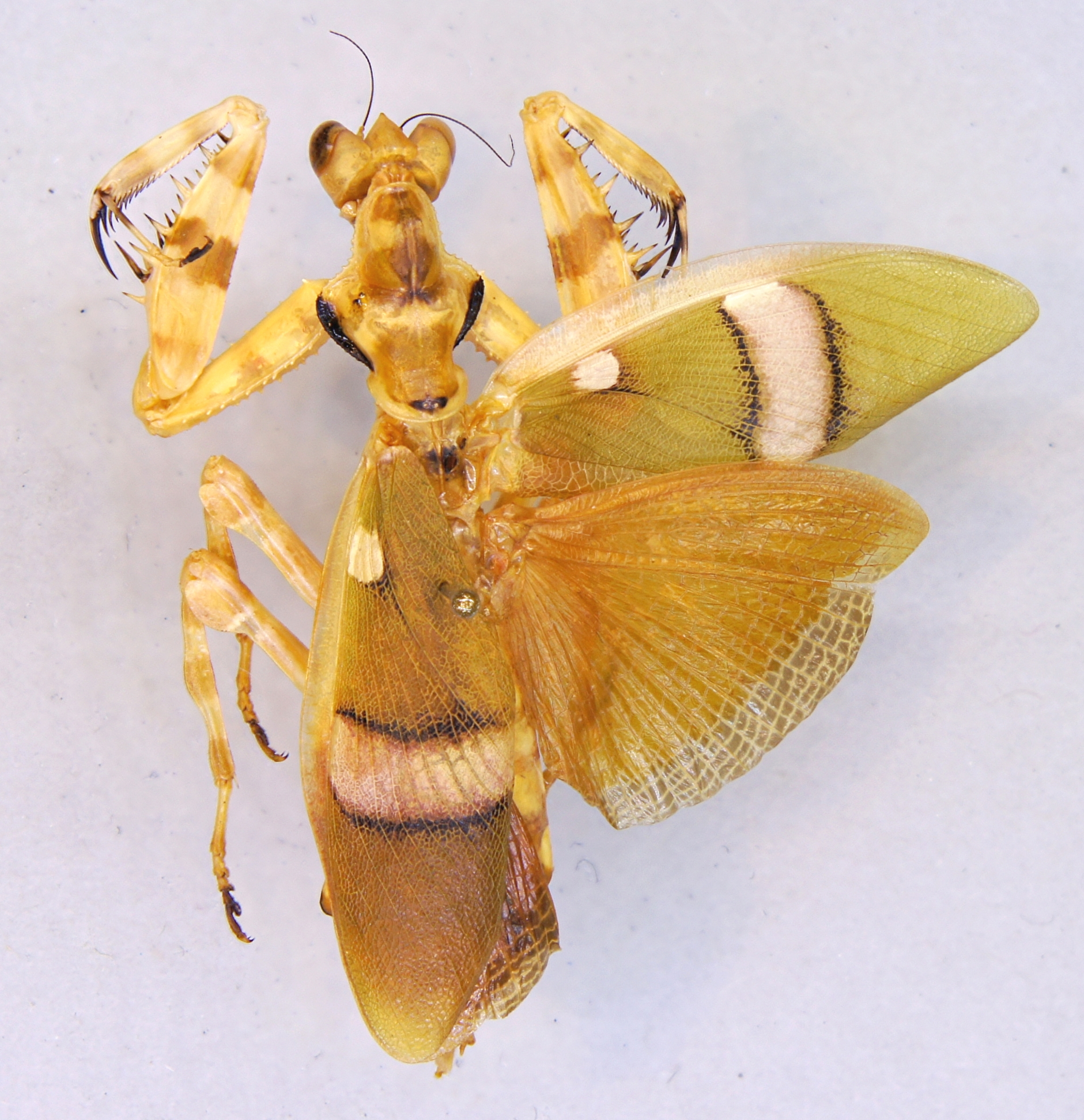
- Theopropus elegans female

Scientific classification
- Kingdom: Animalia
- Phylum: Arthropoda
- Clade: Pancrustacea
- Class: Insecta
- Order: Mantodea
- Family: Hymenopodidae
- Subfamily: Hymenopodinae
- Tribe: Hymenopodini
- Genus: Theopropus; Saussure, 1898

= Theopropus =

Genus of praying mantises

Theopropus is an Asian genus of praying mantids in the family Hymenopodidae: subfamily Hymenopodinae and tribe Hymenopodini.

== Species ==
The Mantodea Species File includes:

1. Theopropus borneensis
2. Theopropus cattulus
3. Theopropus elegans
4. Theopropus rubrobrunneus
