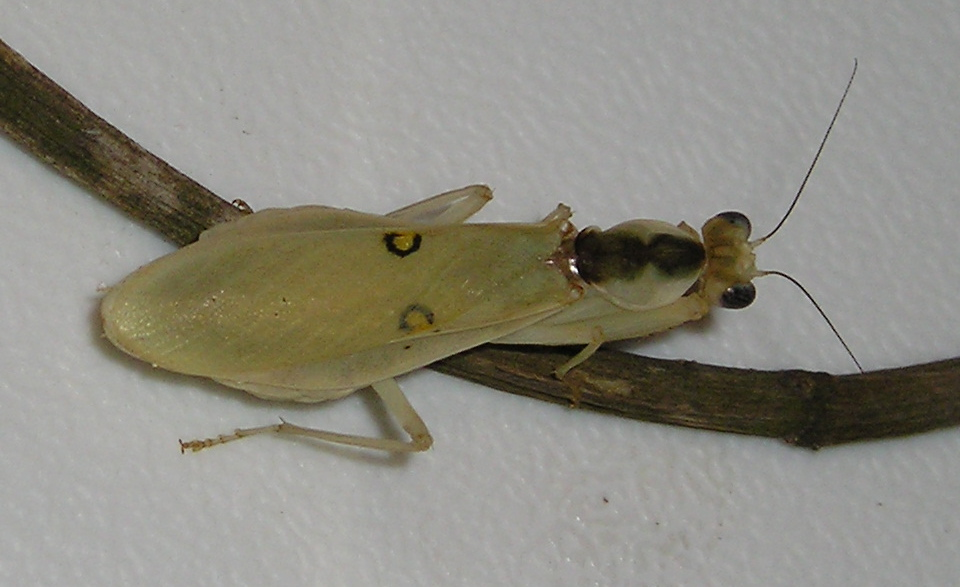
- Adult female

Scientific classification
- Kingdom: Animalia
- Phylum: Arthropoda
- Clade: Pancrustacea
- Class: Insecta
- Order: Mantodea
- Family: Hymenopodidae
- Tribe: Hymenopodini
- Subtribe: Pseudocreobotrina
- Genus: Chloroharpax; Werner, 1908
- Species: C. modesta

Binomial name
- Chloroharpax modesta (Gerstaecker, 1883)

Synonyms
- (Species): Chloroharpax ocellifer Werner, 1908

= Chloroharpax =

Genus of praying mantises

Chloroharpax is a genus of mantises in the family Hymenopodidae. The genus is monotypic, being represented by a single species, Chloroharpax modesta, commonly called the Nigerian flower mantis, and is found across West Africa.

== Description ==
Both males and females are about 3-4 centimeters in length when adult while 1st instar nymphs are about 4-5 millimeters in length. The adults are bright green with rounded blue eyes; adult females have a pair yellow ocellated eyespots on their wings. The species is able to hunt prey larger than itself, attacking and chasing its prey.

== Range ==
Ivory Coast, Guinea, Ghana, Republic of the Congo, Gabon and Cameroon.

== See also ==
- List of mantis genera and species
