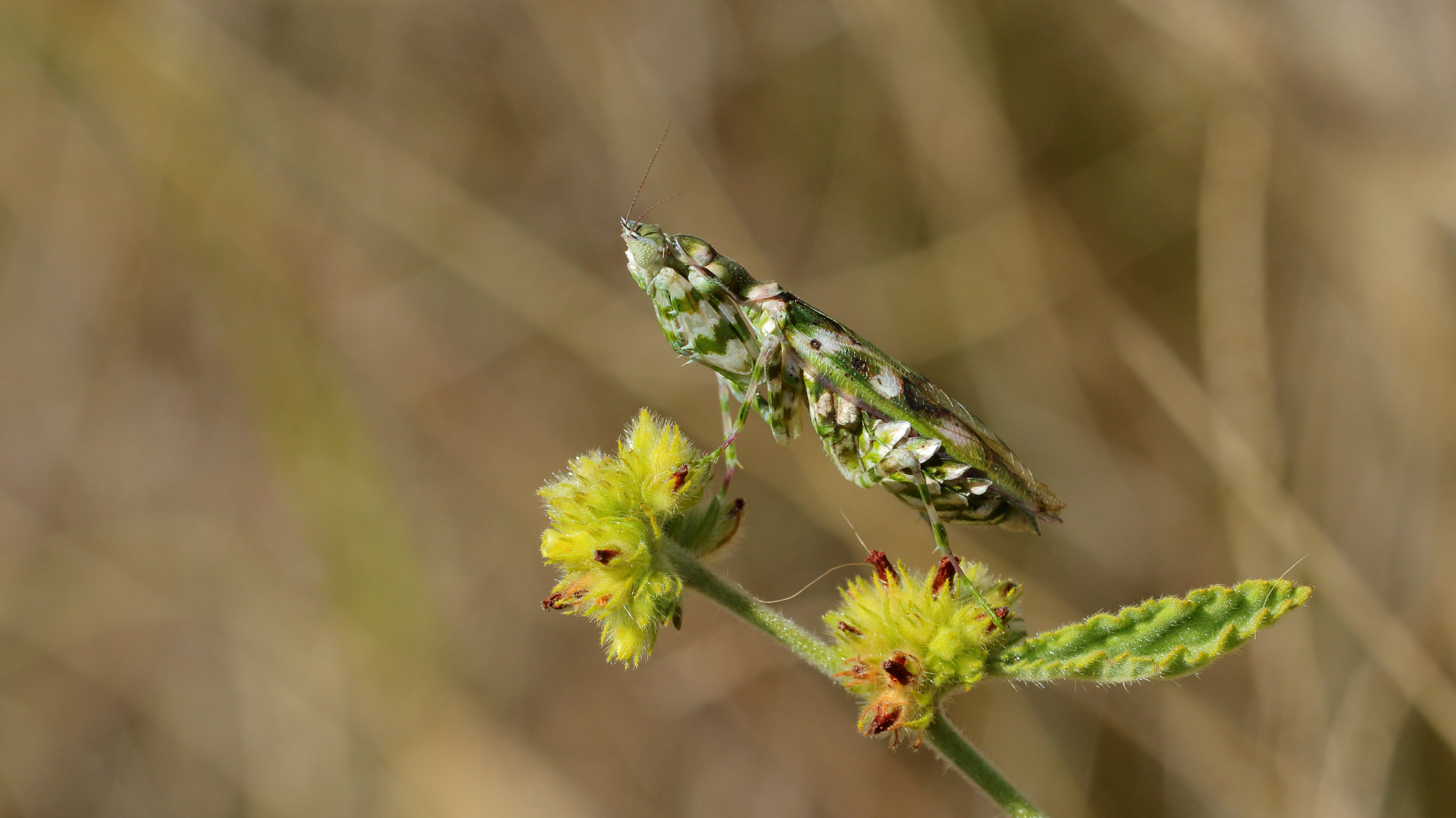

Scientific classification
- Kingdom: Animalia
- Phylum: Arthropoda
- Clade: Pancrustacea
- Class: Insecta
- Order: Mantodea
- Family: Galinthiadidae
- Genus: Harpagomantis; Kirby, 1899
- Species: H. tricolor

Binomial name
- Harpagomantis tricolor Linne, 1758

Synonyms
- (Genus): Australomantis Rehn, 1901; Harpax Serville, 1831; (Species): Harpagomantis cornuta Olivier, 1792; Harpagomantis discolor Stal, 1877; Harpagomantis lobata Fabricius, 1781; Harpagomantis paradoxa Goeze, 1778; Harpagomantis quadricornis Stoll, 1813; Harpagomantis spinocula Serville, 1839

= Harpagomantis =

Genus of praying mantises

Harpagomantis is a genus of praying mantises in the family Galinthiadidae found in Africa. It is monotypic, being represented by the single species Harpagomantis tricolor.

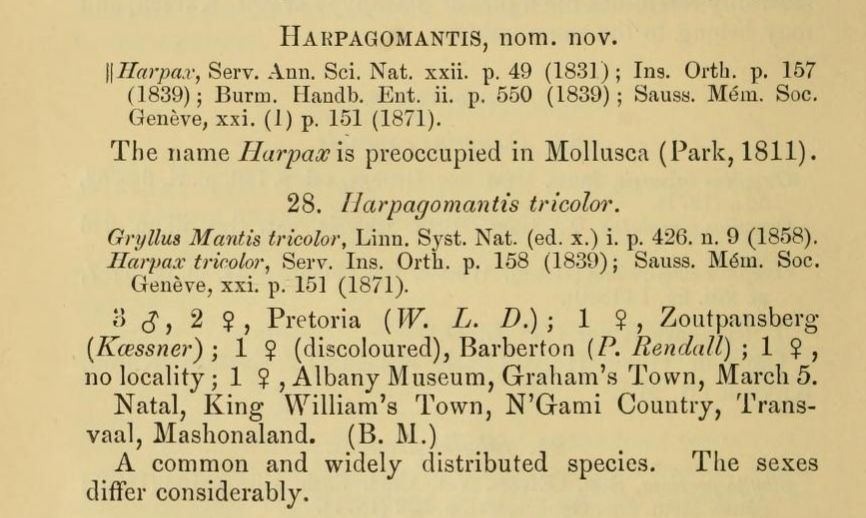
Copy of the original description of the genus Harpagomantis, published in 1899.

== See also ==
- List of mantis genera and species
- Flower mantis
