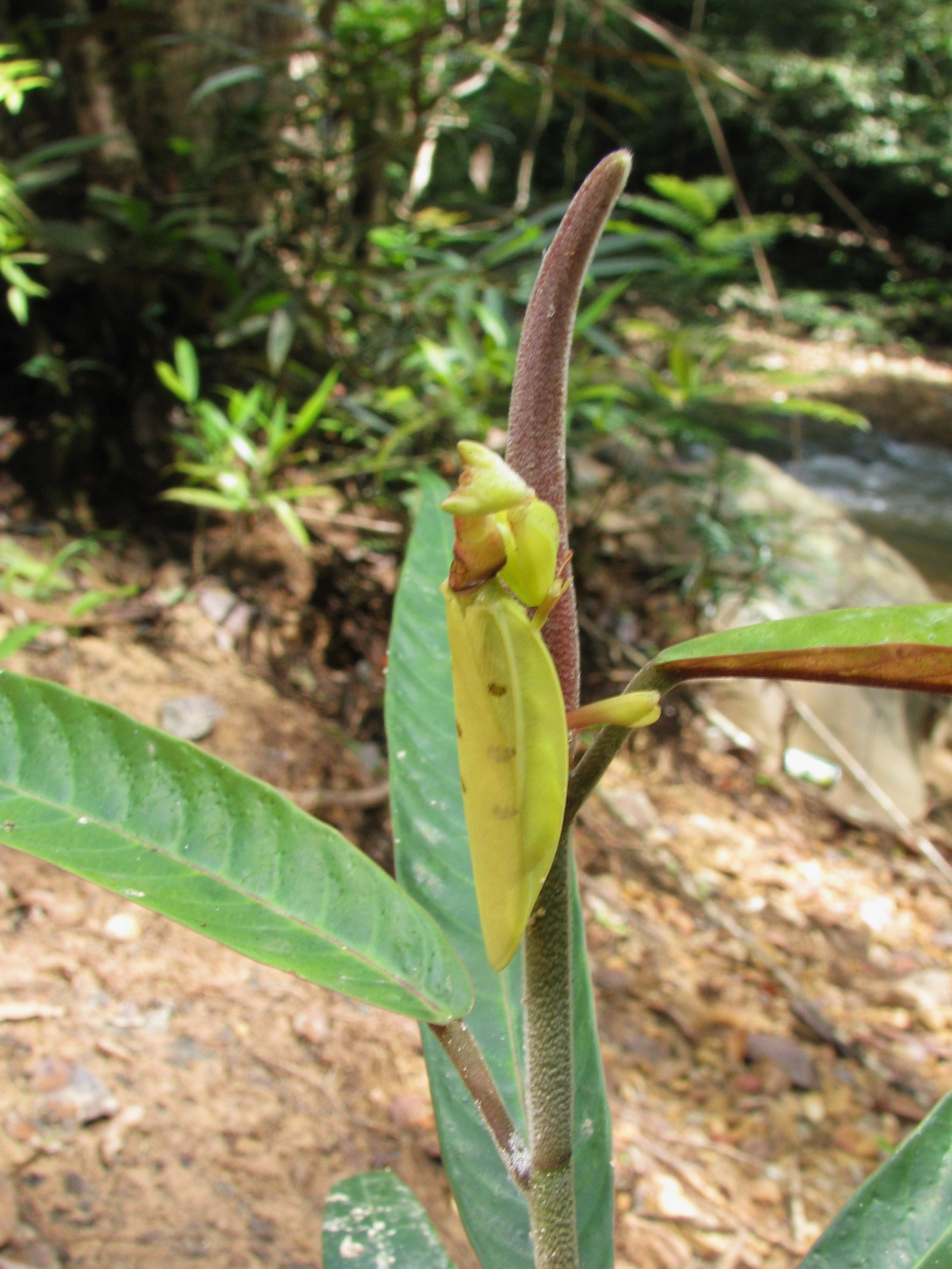

Scientific classification
- Kingdom: Animalia
- Phylum: Arthropoda
- Clade: Pancrustacea
- Class: Insecta
- Order: Mantodea
- Family: Hymenopodidae
- Genus: Helvia; Stal, 1877
- Species: H. cardinalis

Binomial name
- Helvia cardinalis Stal, 1877

Synonyms
- (Genus): Parhymenopus Wood-Mason, 1890; Parymenopus Wood-Mason, 1890; (Species): Parymenopus davisoni Wood-Mason, 1890

= Helvia =

Helvia cardinalis

Genus of praying mantises

Helvia is a genus of praying mantises in the family Hymenopodidae found in Southeast Asia. It is monotypic, being represented by the single species, Helvia cardinalis.

== Taxonomy ==
Helvia cardinalis is known by various common names including yellow flower mantis and Davison's mantis. It is one of several species known as flower mantises due to their appearance and behaviour which gives them a camouflaged resemblance to flowers.

== Description ==
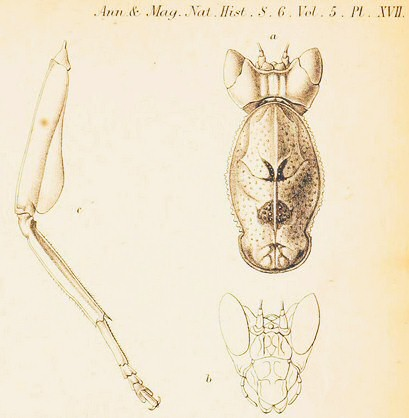
Anatomical drawing by James Wood-Mason, 1890

This slender species is mainly plain yellow or greenish. The female (38 mm long) is much larger than the male, with three dark spots on the somewhat pointed wings.

== See also ==
- List of mantis genera and species
- Flower mantis
