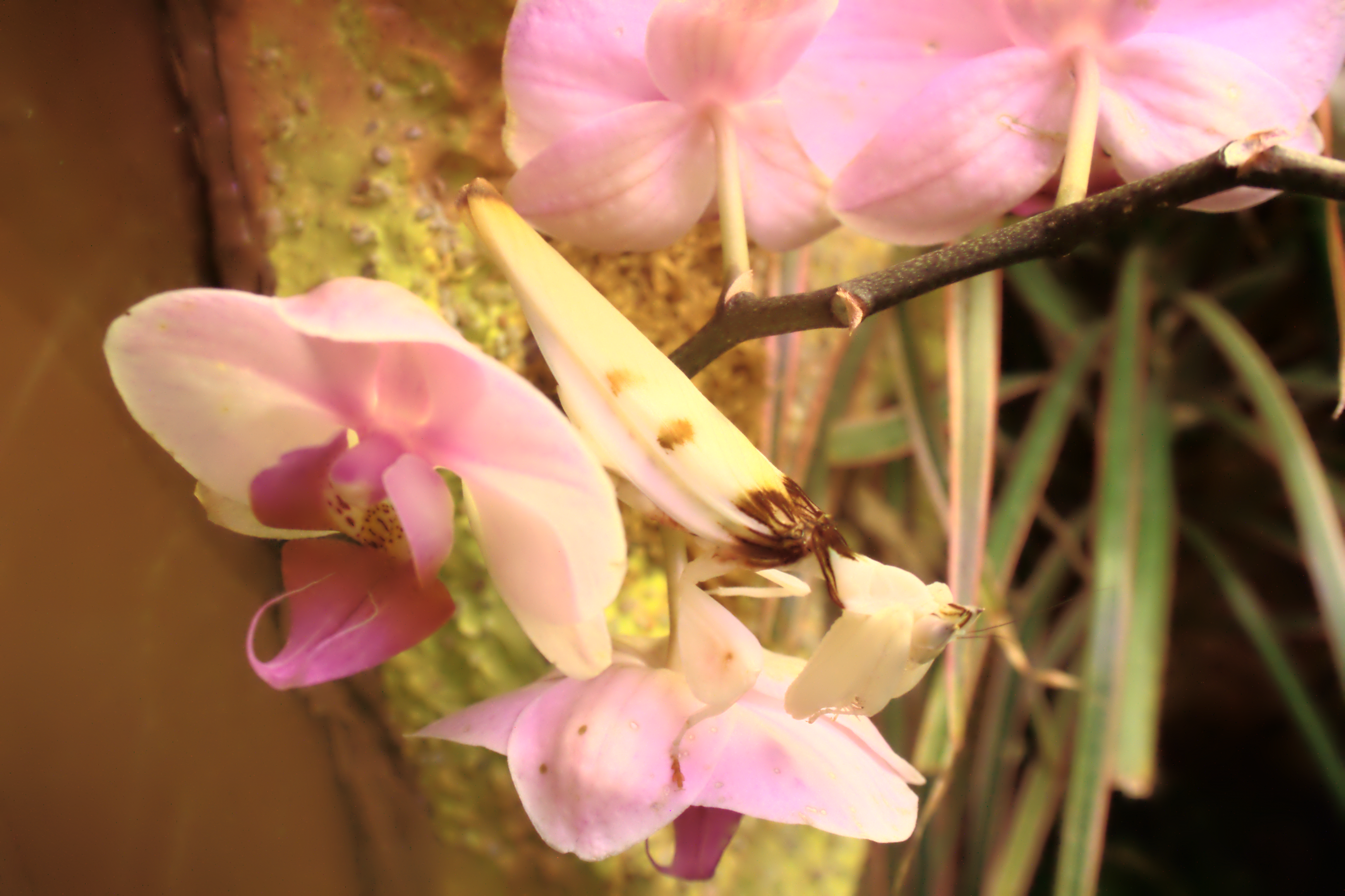
- Adult female Hymenopus coronatus
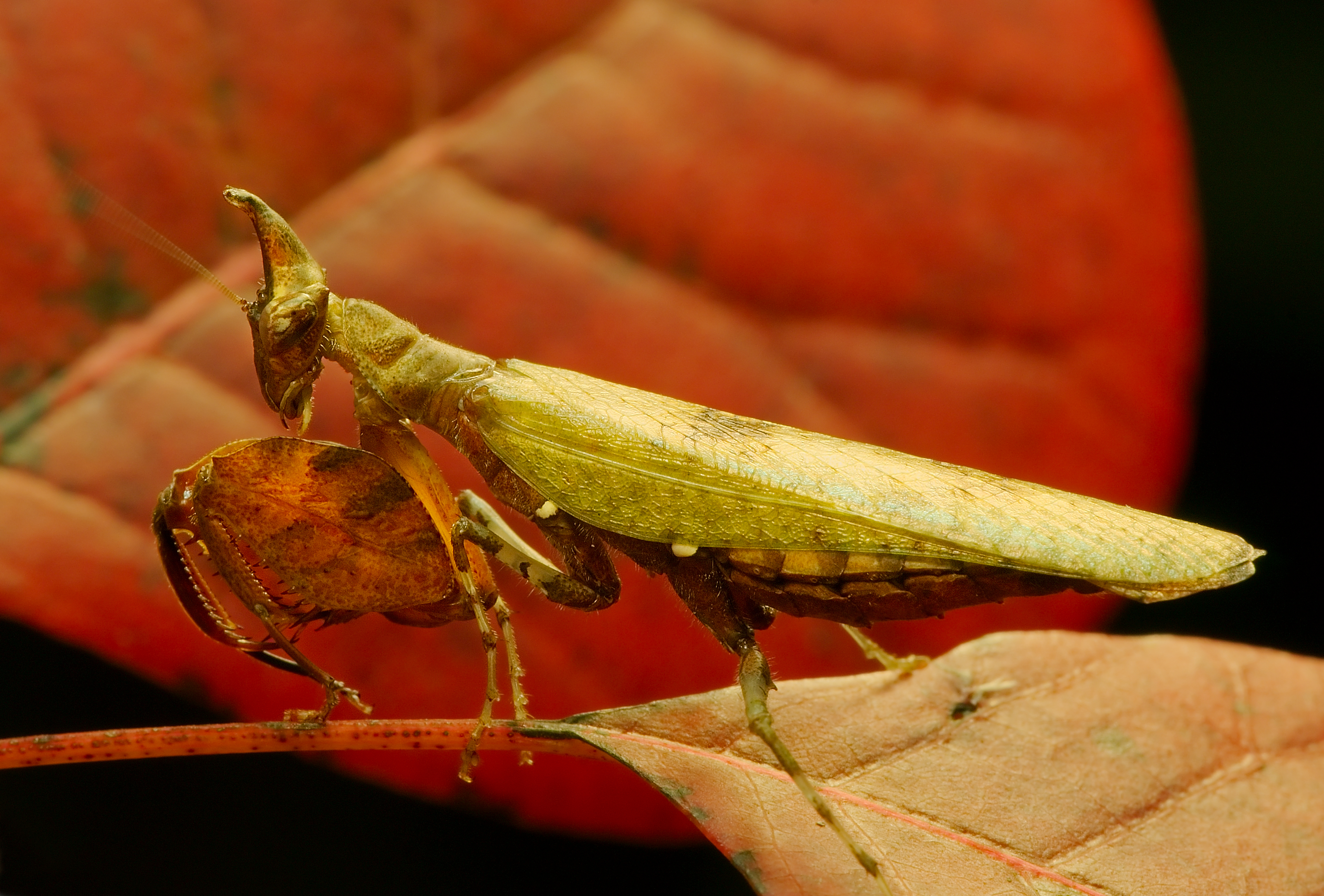
- Adult female Hestiasula brunneriana

Scientific classification
- Kingdom: Animalia
- Phylum: Arthropoda
- Clade: Pancrustacea
- Class: Insecta
- Order: Mantodea
- Clade: Promantidea
- Clade: Mantidea
- Superfamily: Hymenopodoidea
- Family: Hymenopodidae; Giglio-Tos, 1927

Subfamilies
- See text

= Hymenopodidae =

Family of praying mantises

Hymenopodidae is a family of the order Mantodea (mantises), which contains six subfamilies. Some of the species in this family mimic flowers and are found camouflaged among them; these are called flower mantises. Their coloration is aggressive mimicry, luring prey to approach close enough to be seized and eaten.

== Subfamilies, tribes and genera ==
The Mantodea Species File lists:

=== Acromantinae ===
Auth: Giglio-Tos, 1919

- tribe Acromantini
  - Acromantis Saussure, 1870
  - Ambivia Stal, 1877
  - Citharomantis Rehn, 1909
  - Majangella Giglio-Tos, 1915
  - Metacromantis Beier, 1930
  - Oligomantis Giglio-Tos, 1915
  - Parapsychomantis Shcherbakov, 2017
  - Psychomantis Giglio-Tos, 1915
  - Rhomantis Giglio-Tos, 1915
- tribe Otomantini
  - Anasigerpes Giglio-Tos, 1915
  - Chrysomantis Giglio-Tos, 1915
  - Otomantis Bolivar, 1890
  - Oxypiloidea Schulthess, 1898

=== Hymenopodinae ===
Auth: Giglio-Tos, 1919

- tribe Anaxarchini
  - Anaxarcha Stal, 1877
  - Euantissa Giglio-Tos, 1927
  - Heliomantis Giglio-Tos, 1915
  - Nemotha Wood-Mason, 1884
  - Odontomantis Saussure, 1871
  - Werneriana Shcherbakov, Ehrmann & Borer, 2016
- tribe Hymenopodini
  - Chlidonoptera Karsch, 1892
  - Chloroharpax Werner, 1908
  - Creobroter (Westwood, 1889)
  - Helvia Stal, 1877
  - Hymenopus (Serville, 1831)
  - Panurgica Karsch, 1896
  - Pseudocreobotra Saussure, 1870
  - Theopropus Saussure, 1898

=== Oxypilinae ===
Auth: Giglio-Tos, 1919

- tribe Hestiasulini
  - Astyliasula Schwarz & Shcherbakov, 2017
  - Catestiasula Giglio-Tos, 1915
  - Ephestiasula Giglio-Tos, 1915
  - Hestiasula Saussure, 1871
  - Pseudohestiasula Schwarz & Shcherbakov, 2017
- tribe Oxypilini
  - Ceratomantis Wood-Mason, 1876
  - Junodia Schulthess-Rechberg, 1899
  - Oxypilus Serville, 1831
  - Pachymantis Saussure, 1871
  - Pseudoxypilus Giglio-Tos, 1915

=== Phyllocraniinae ===
Africa:

- Phyllocrania Burmeister, 1838

=== Phyllothelyinae ===
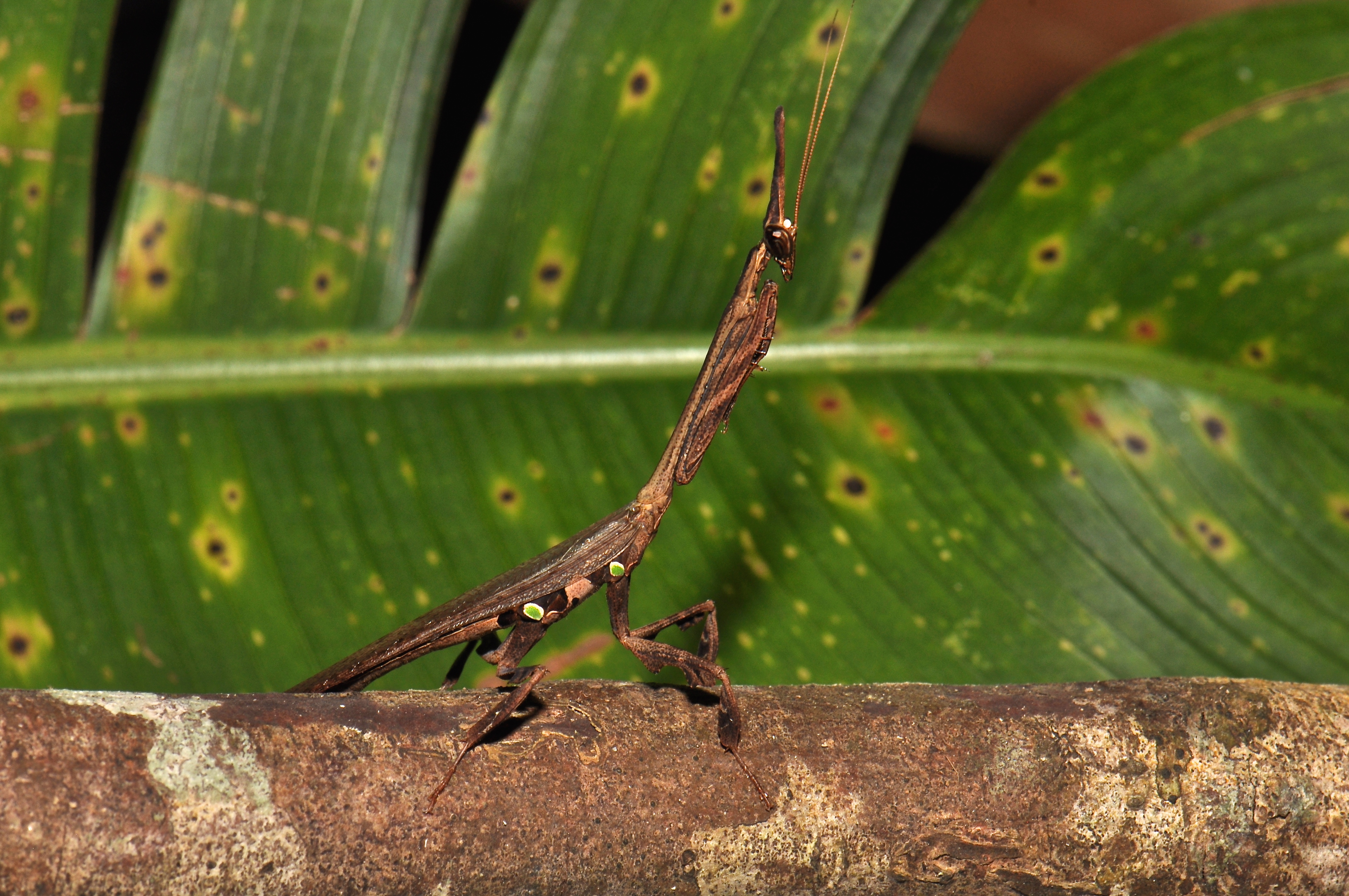
Ceratocrania macra

Southeast Asia:

- tribe Parablepharini
  - Parablepharis Saussure, 1870
- tribe Phyllothelyini
  - Ceratocrania Westwood, 1889
  - Phyllothelys Wood-Mason, 1877

=== Sibyllinae ===
Africa:

- Leptosibylla Roy, 1996
- Presibylla Bolivar, 1908
- Sibylla Stal, 1856

NB: The Epaphroditinae Giglio-Tos, 1915 (from the Caribbean) are now placed in a separate family Epaphroditidae.

== Gallery ==
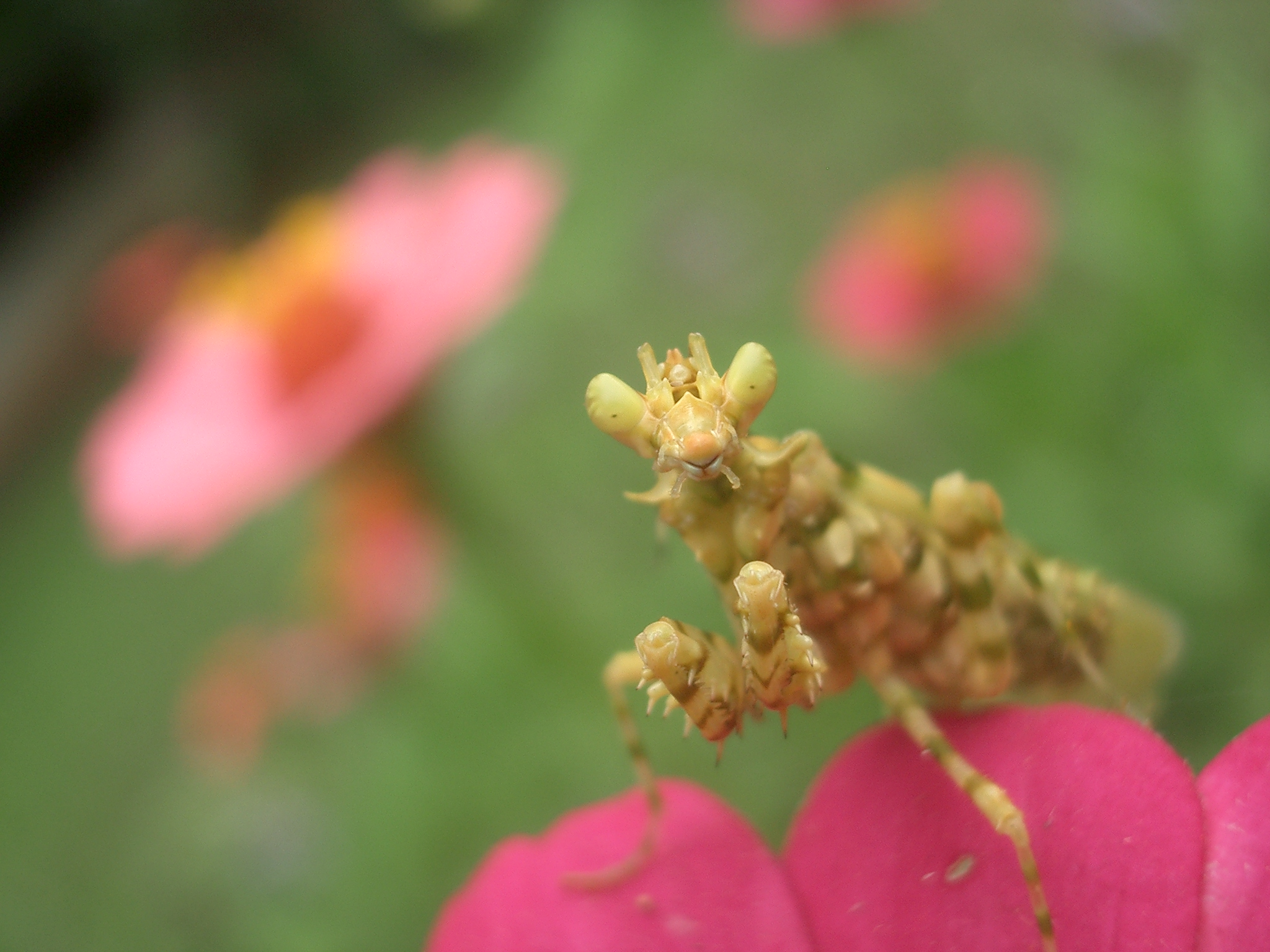
Sudanese Hymenopodid Mantis, Pseudocreobotra species

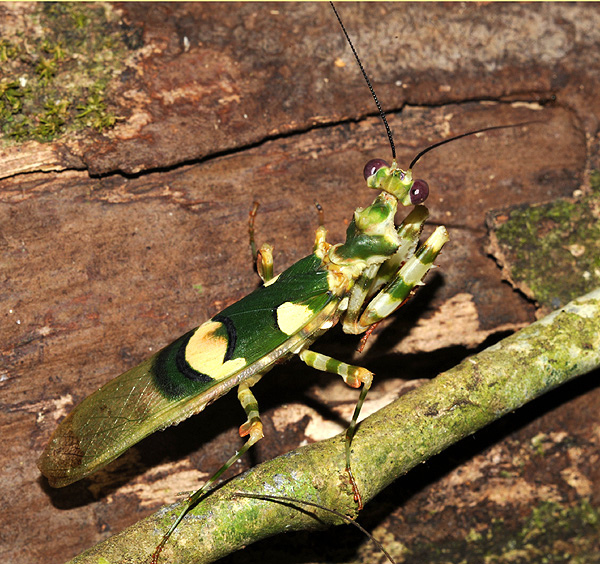
Adult female Chlidonoptera vexillum

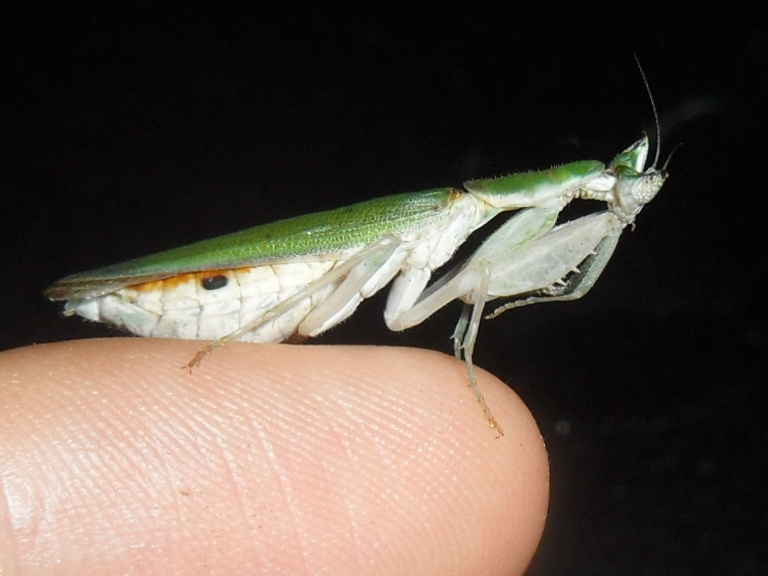
Adult female Pseudoharpax virescens

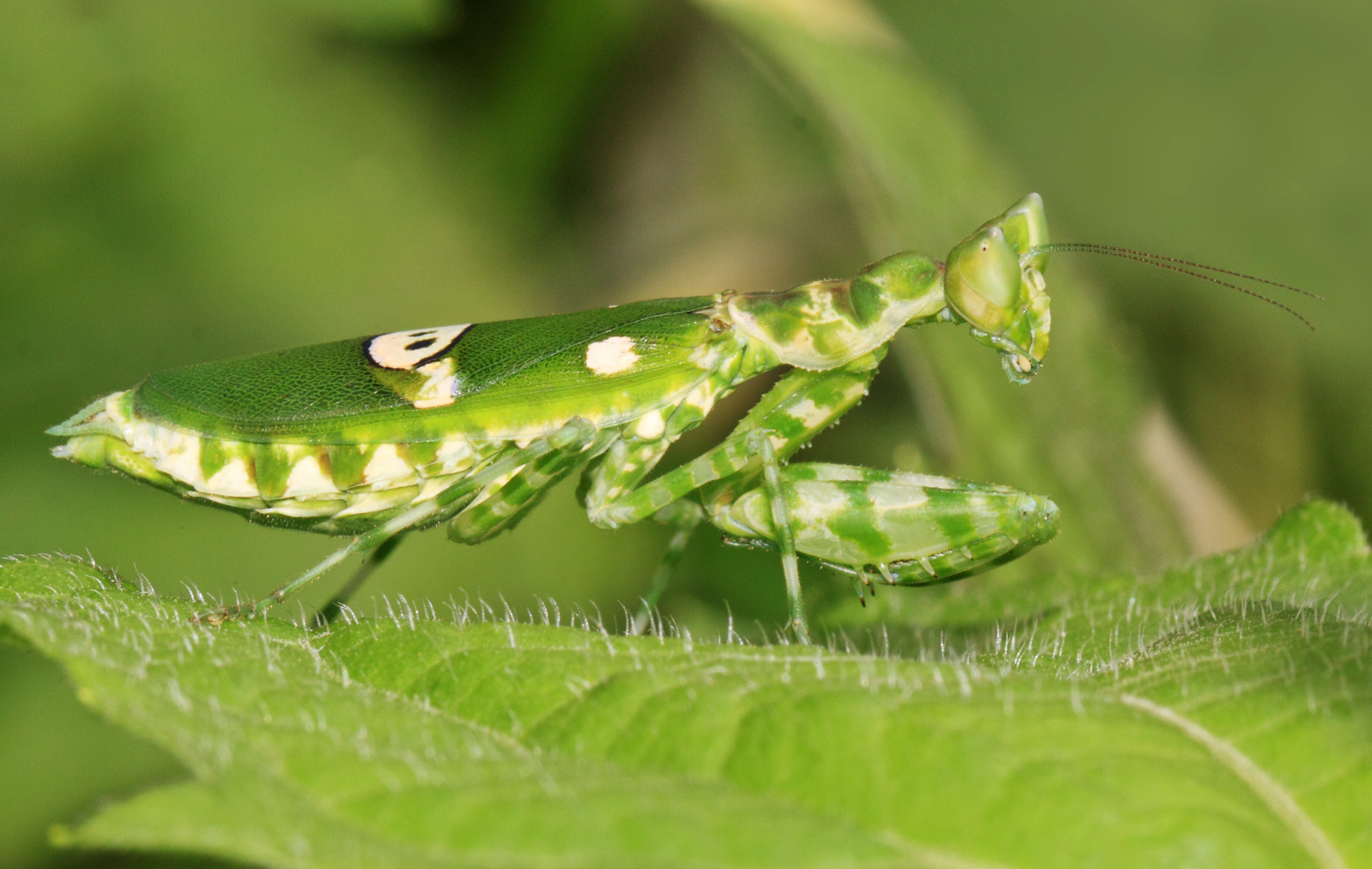
Adult female Creobroter species from West Java

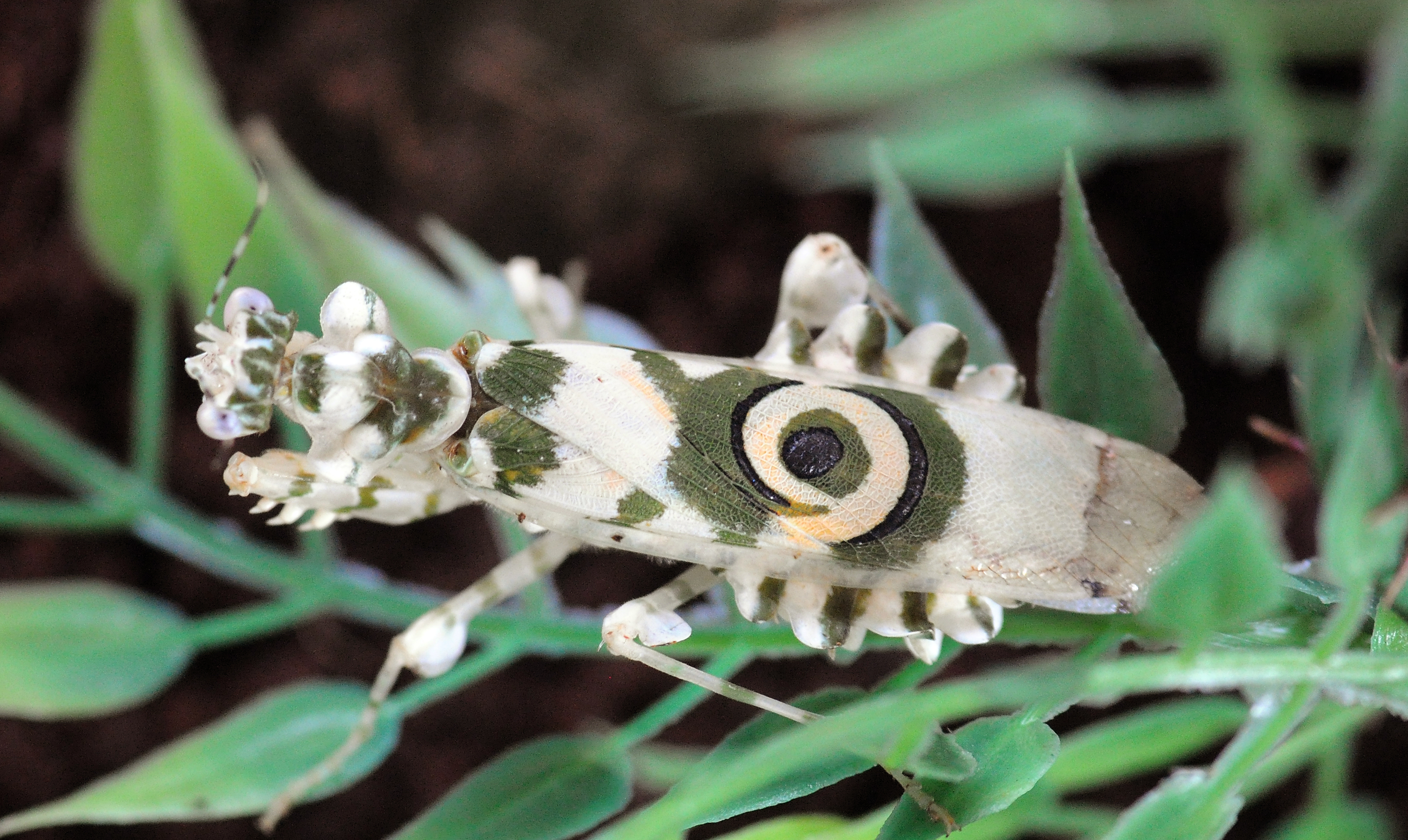
Adult female Pseudocreobotra wahlbergii

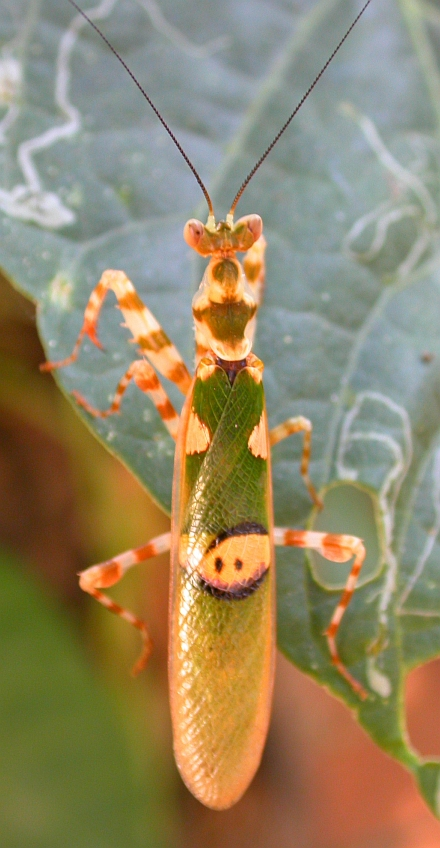
Adult male Creobroter gemmatus

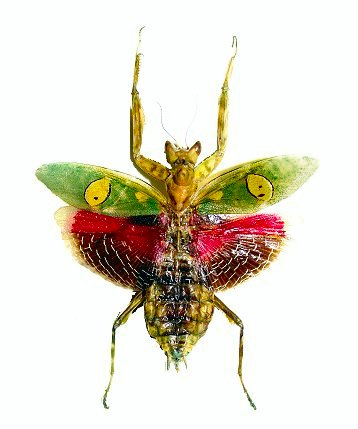
Dead adult female C. gemmatus

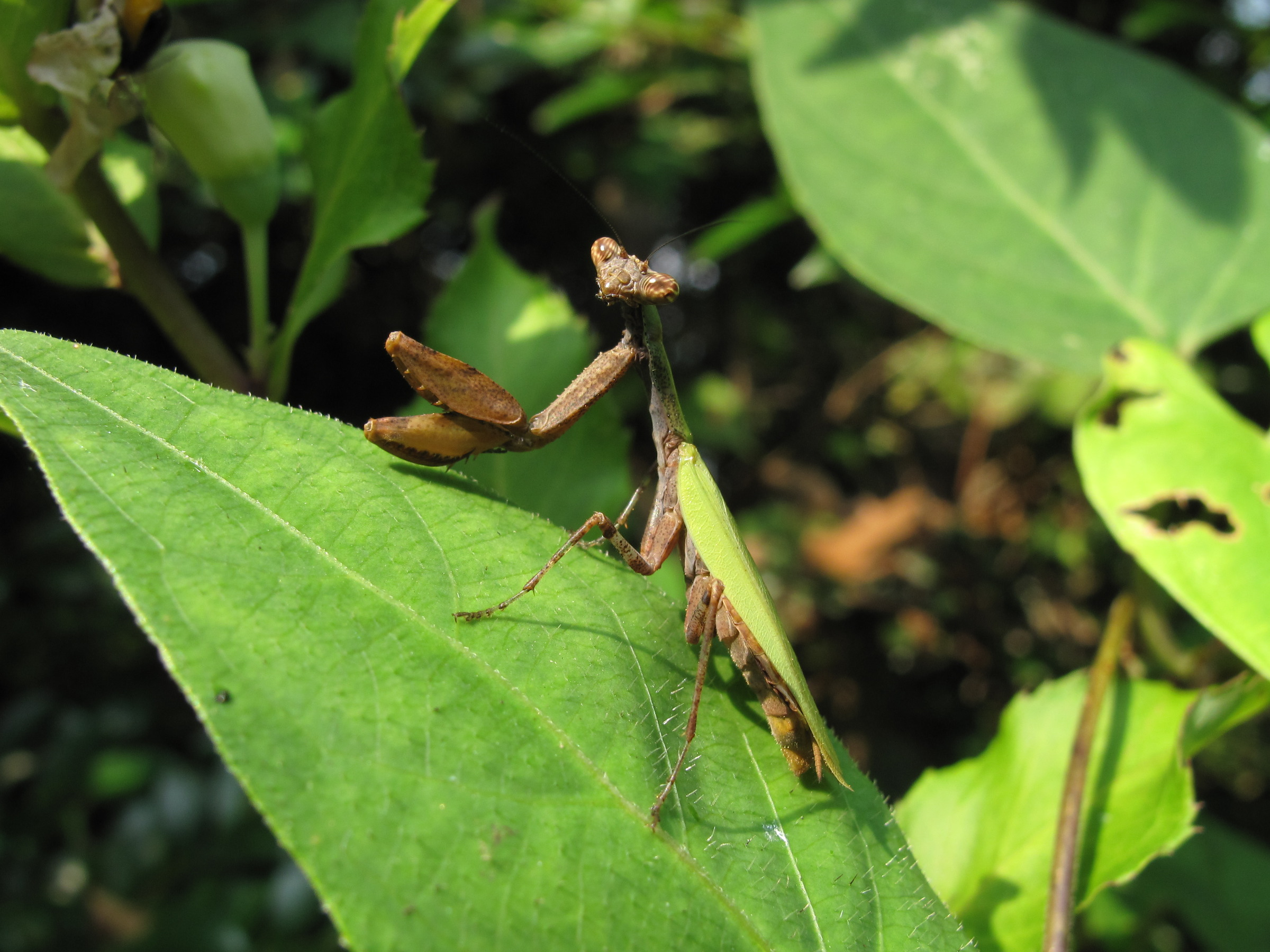
Adult female Acromantis japonica

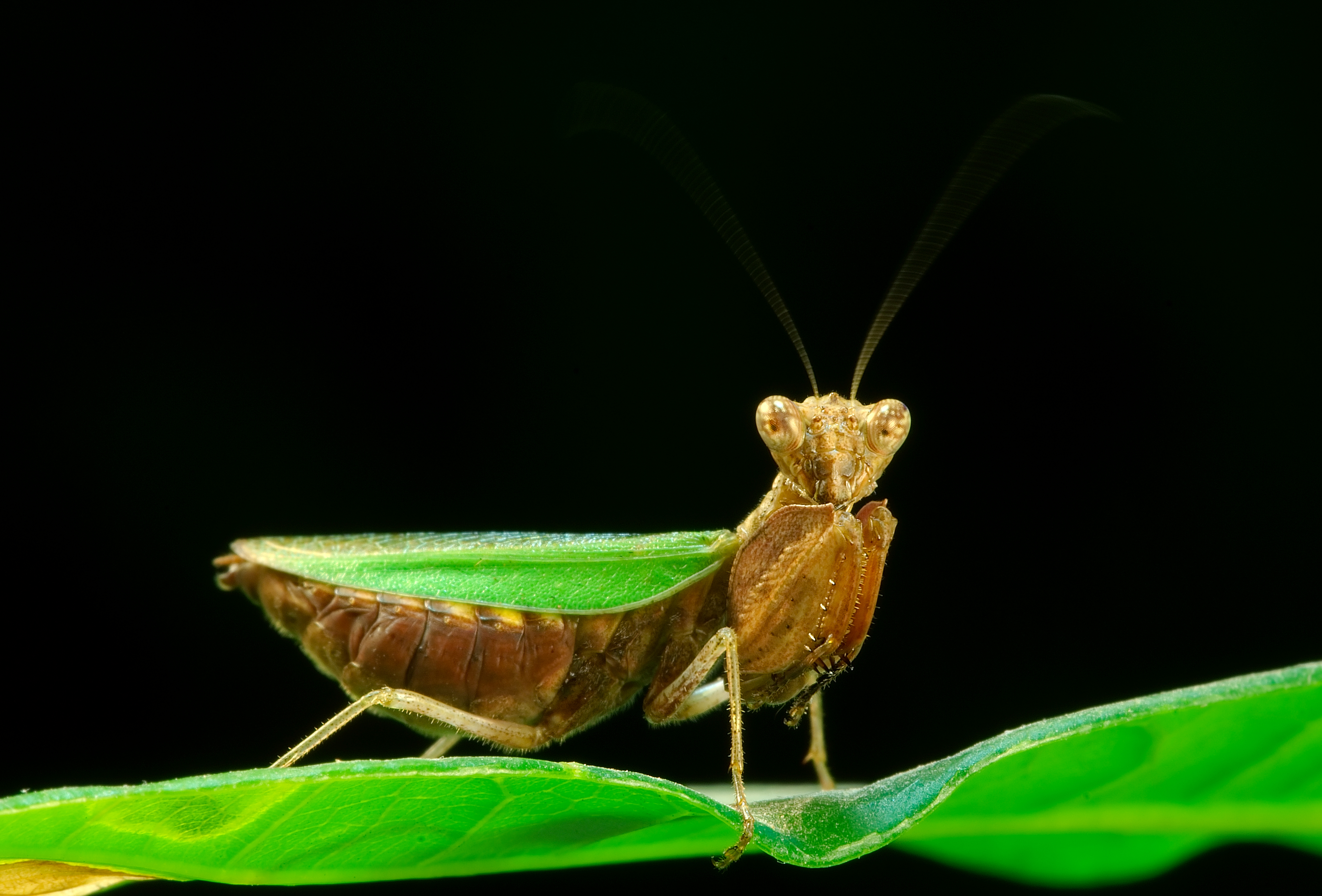
Adult female Ephestiasula species

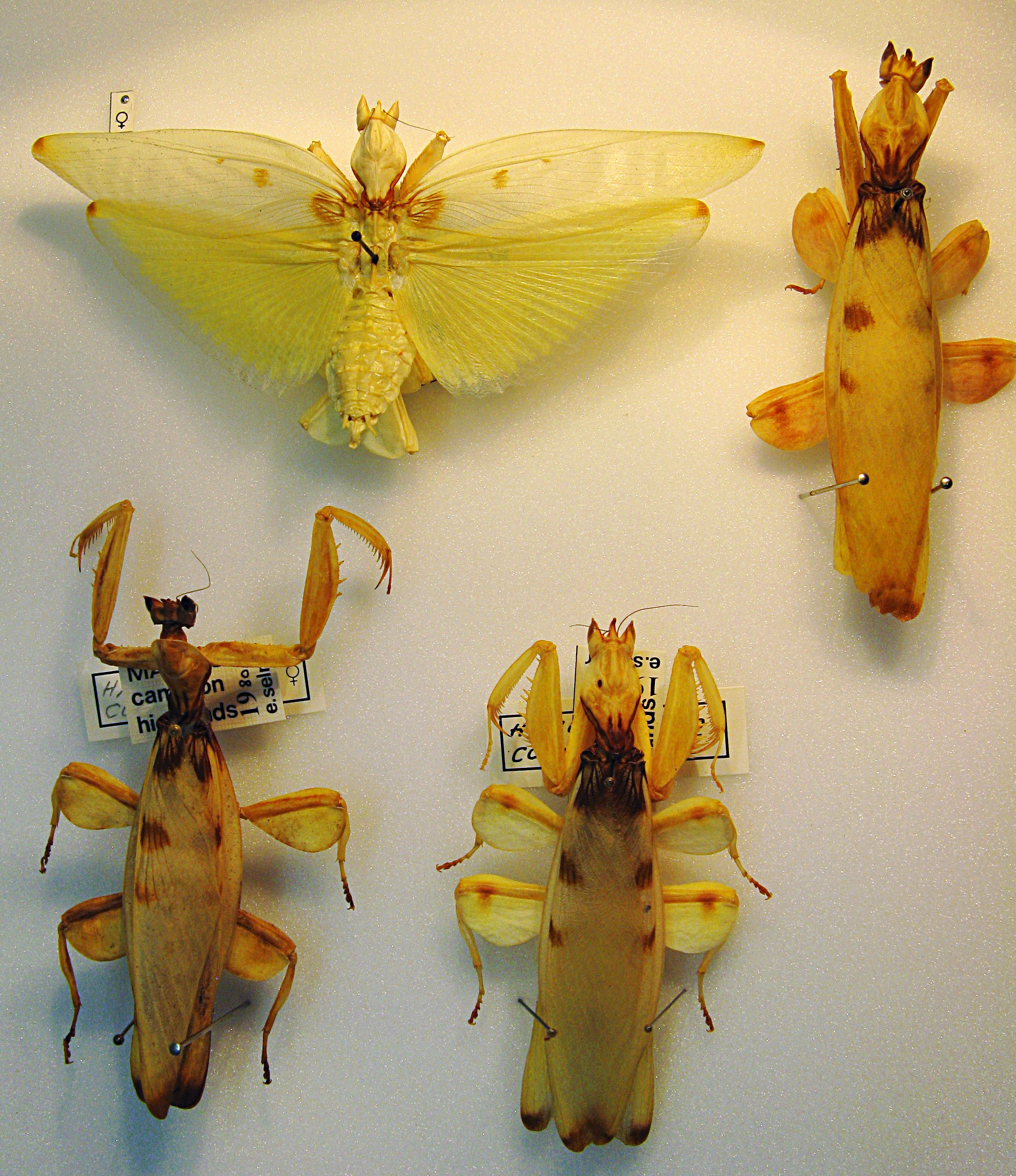
Four dead adult female Hymenopus coronatus

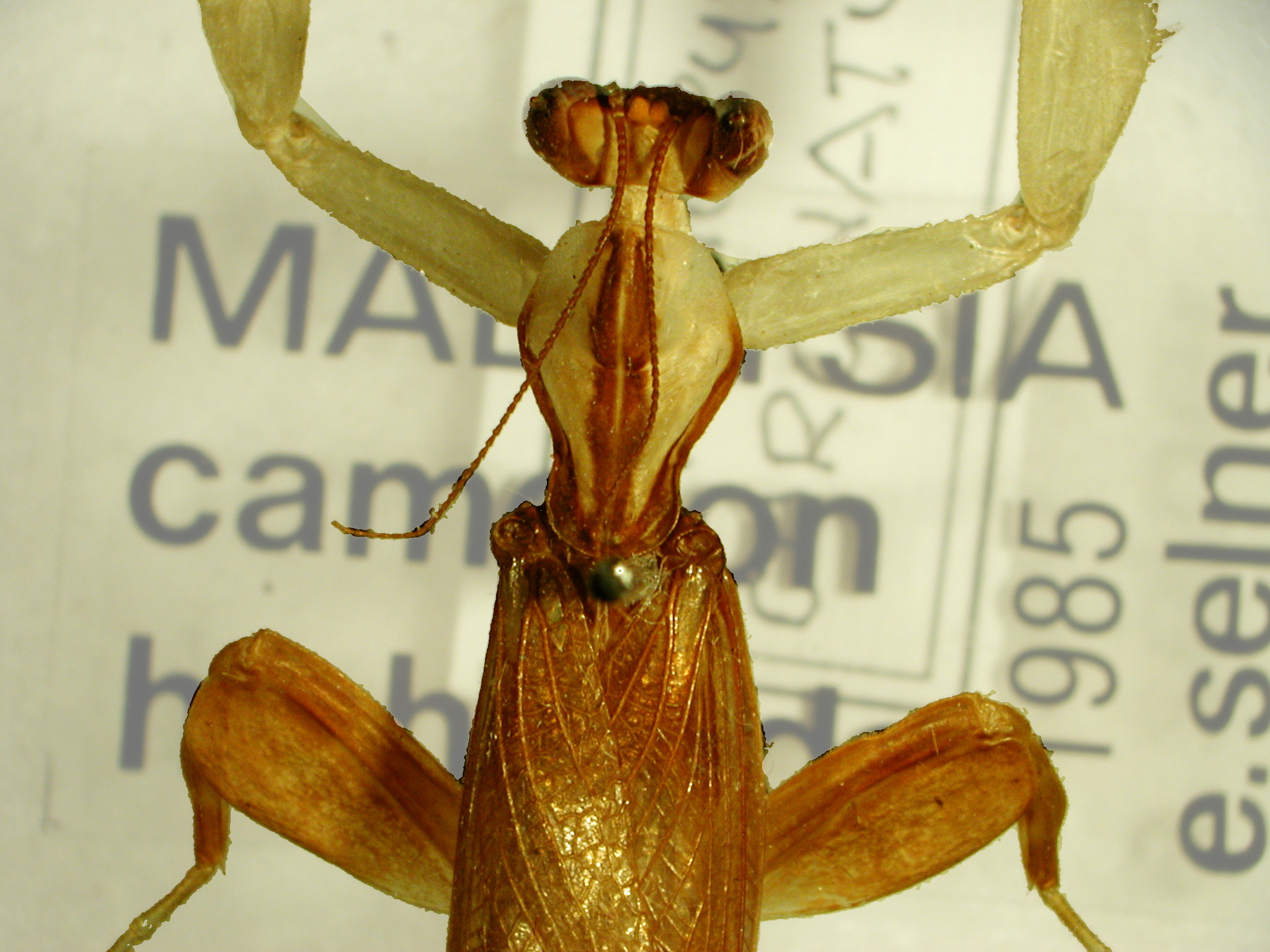
Dead adult male Hymenopus coronatus

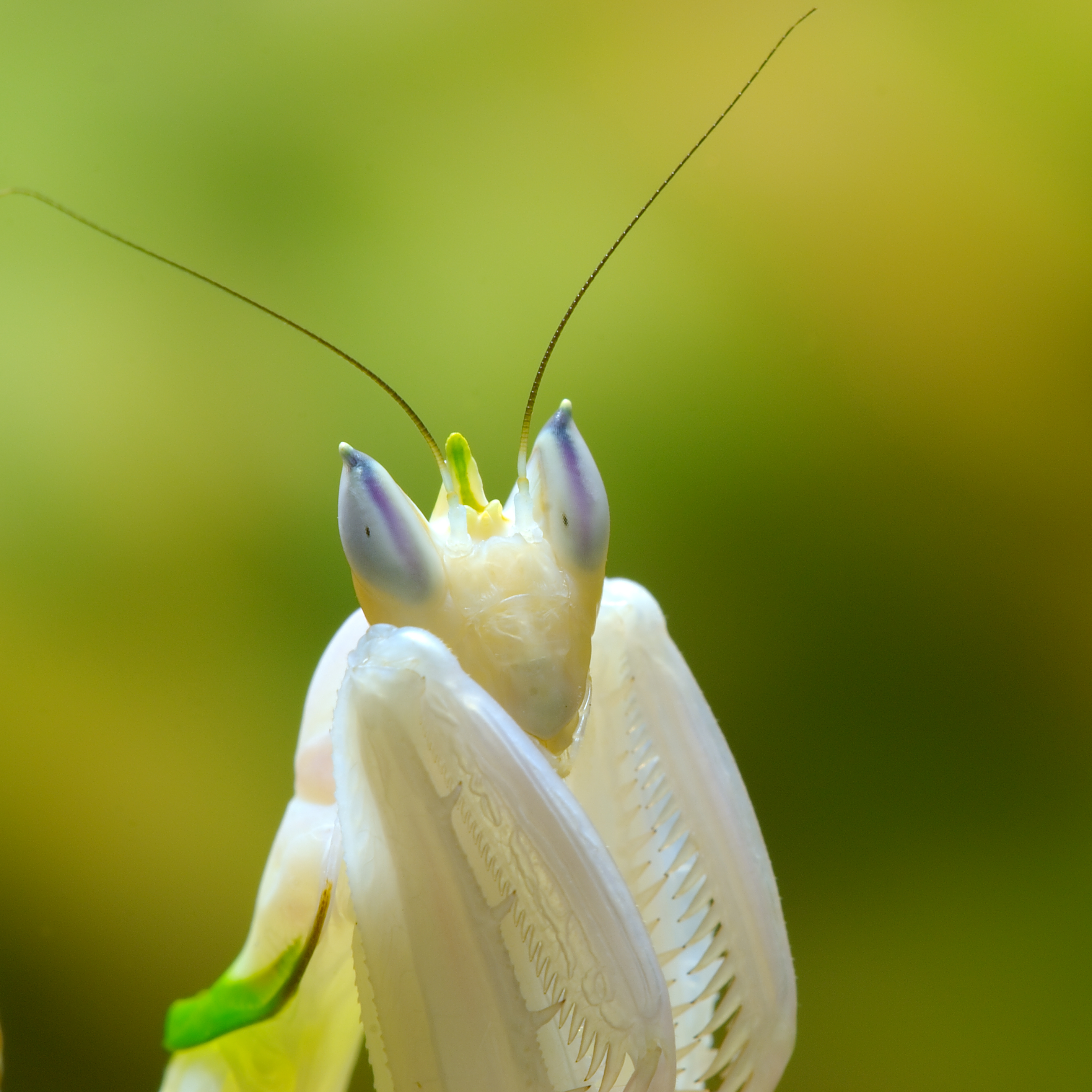
Subadult female Hymenopus coronatus head

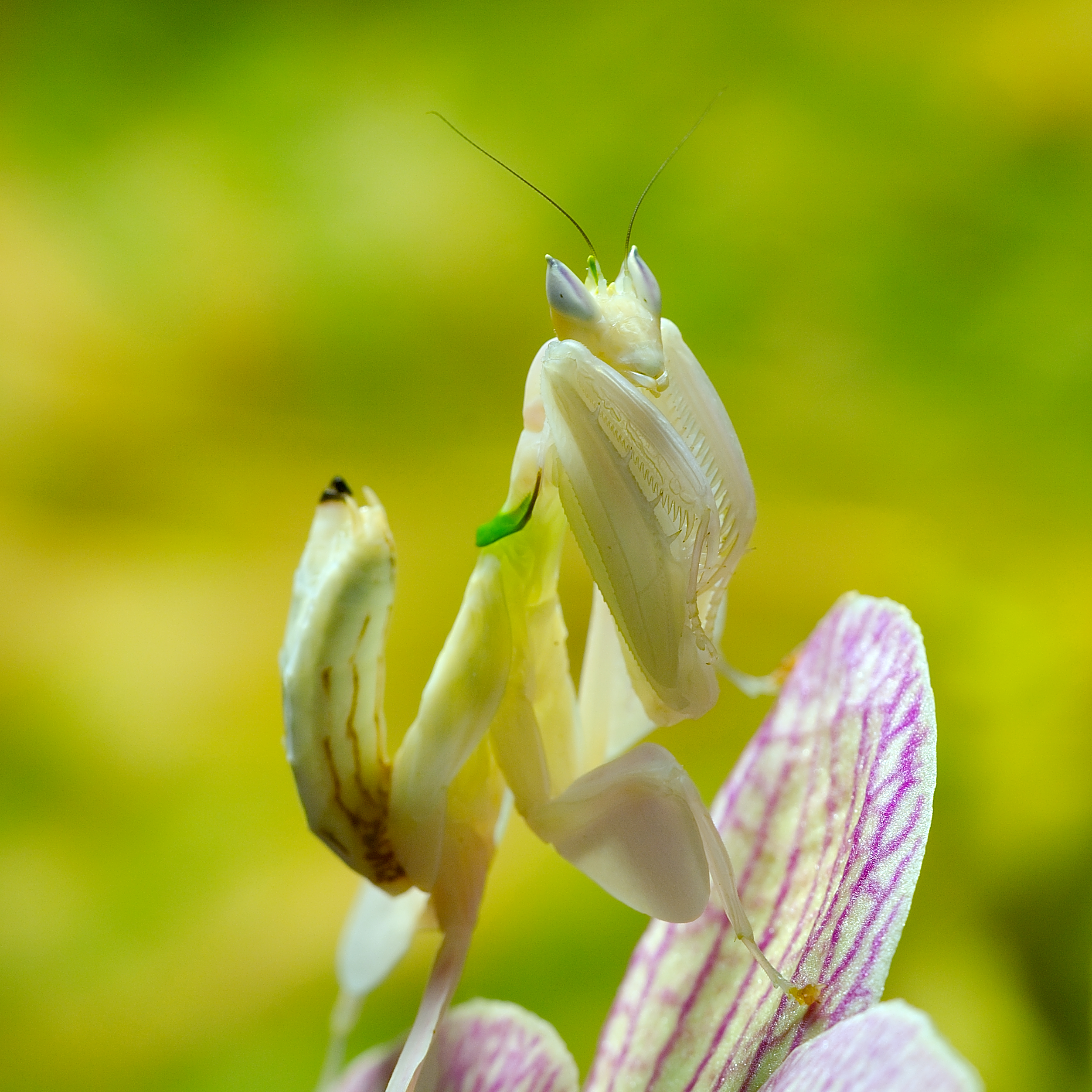
Subadult female H. coronatus

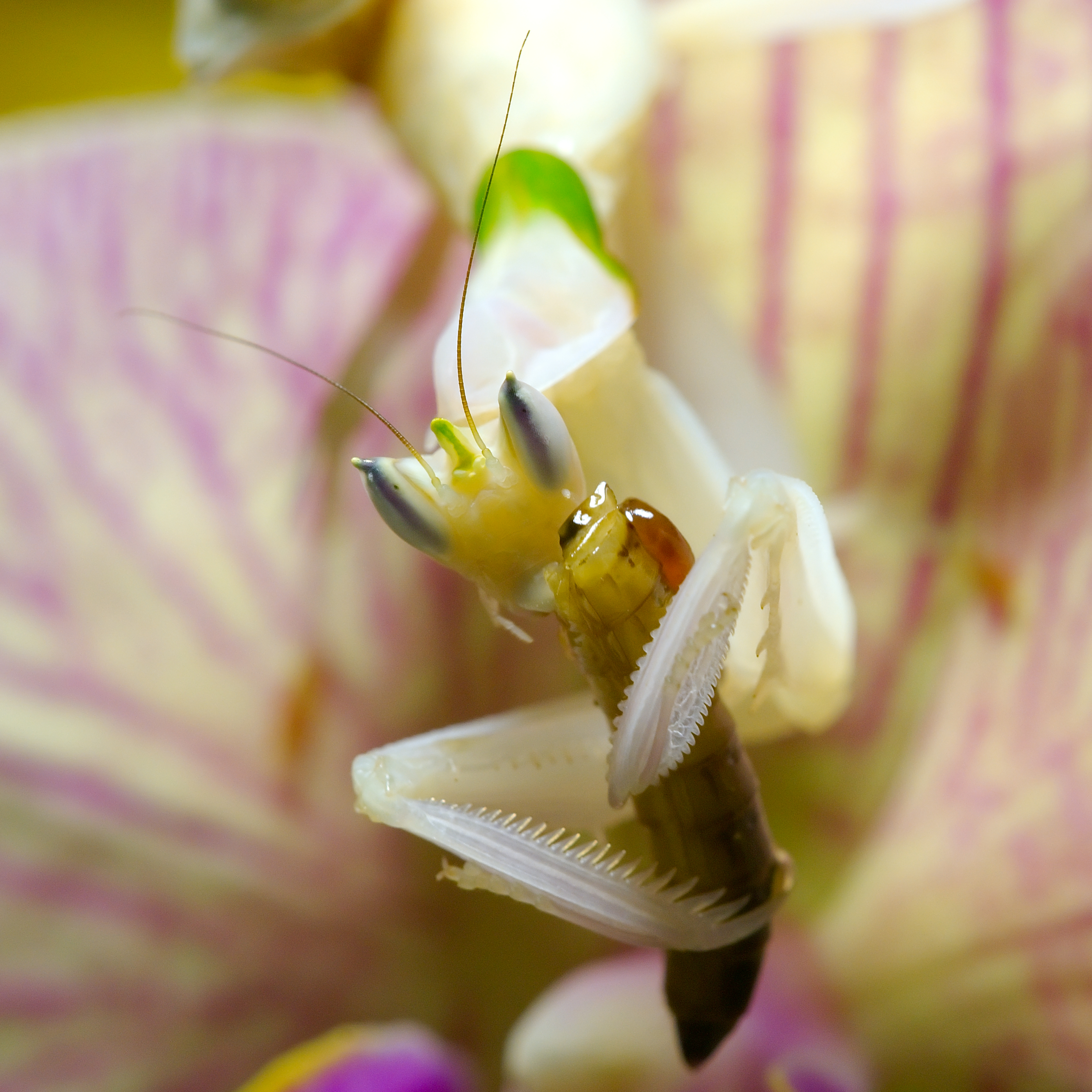
Subadult female H. coronatus eating

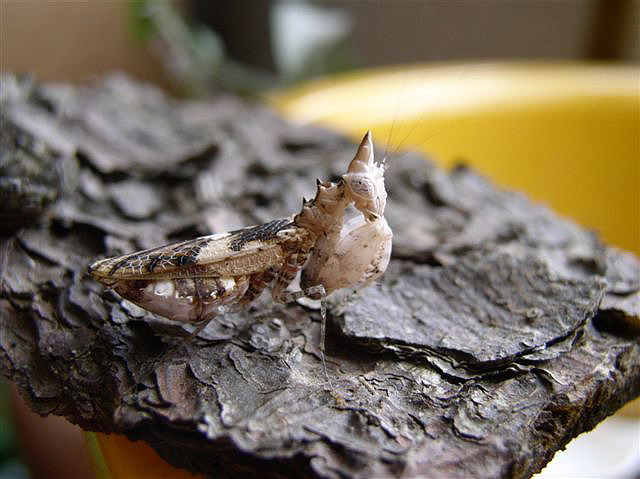
Adult female pakyulisis titinggalit

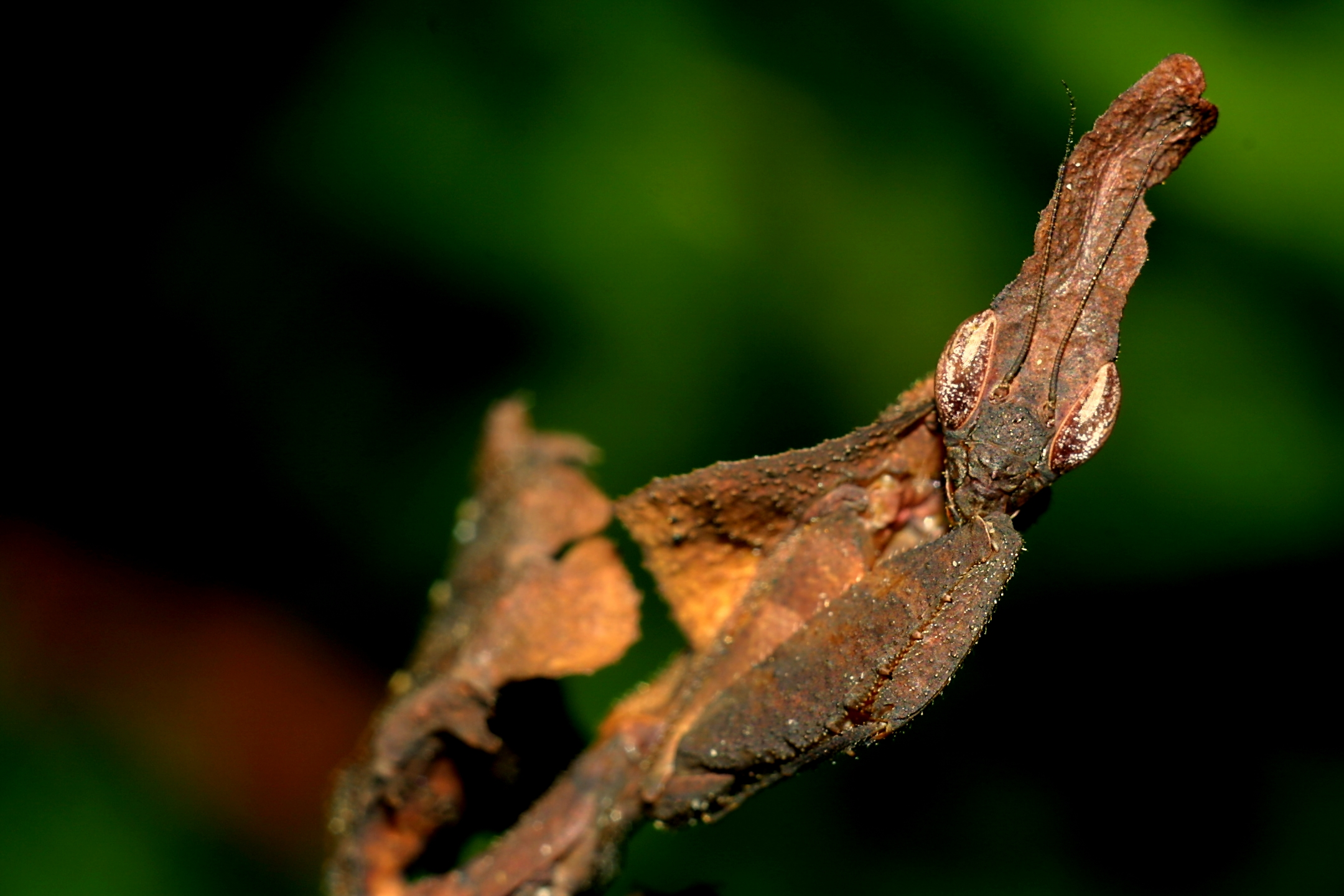
Subadult female Phyllocrania paradoxa

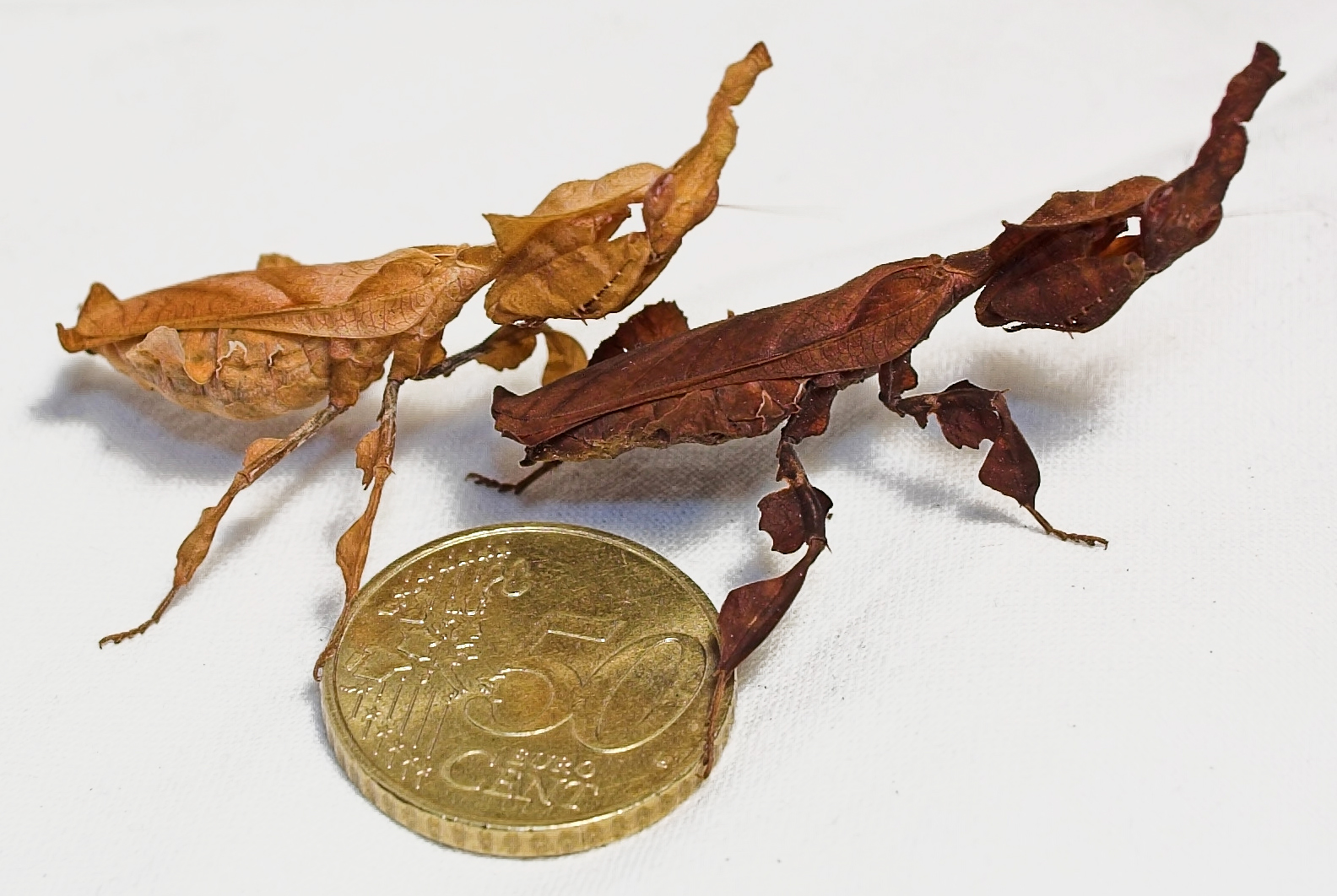
Two adult female P. paradoxa

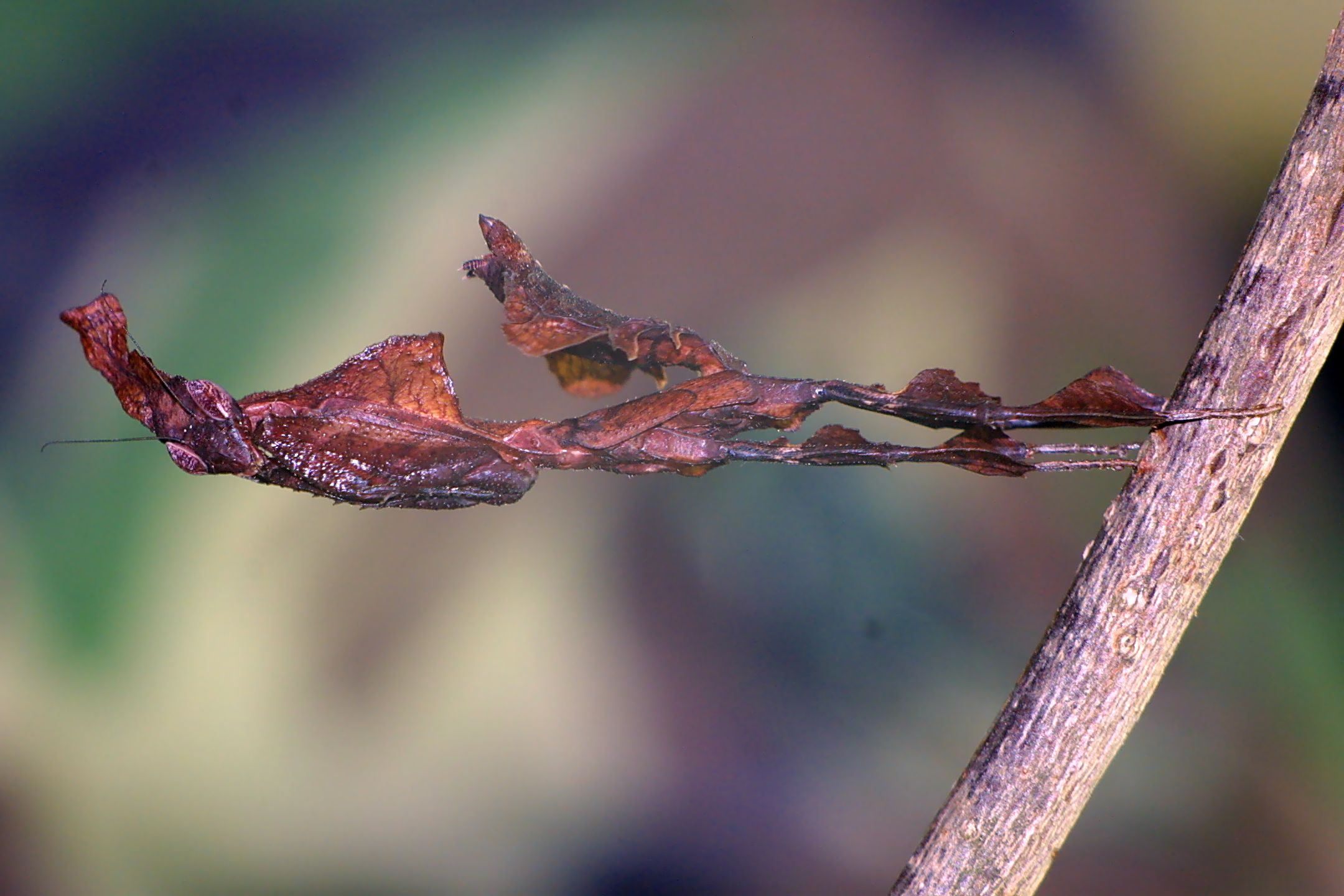
Subadult female P. paradoxa

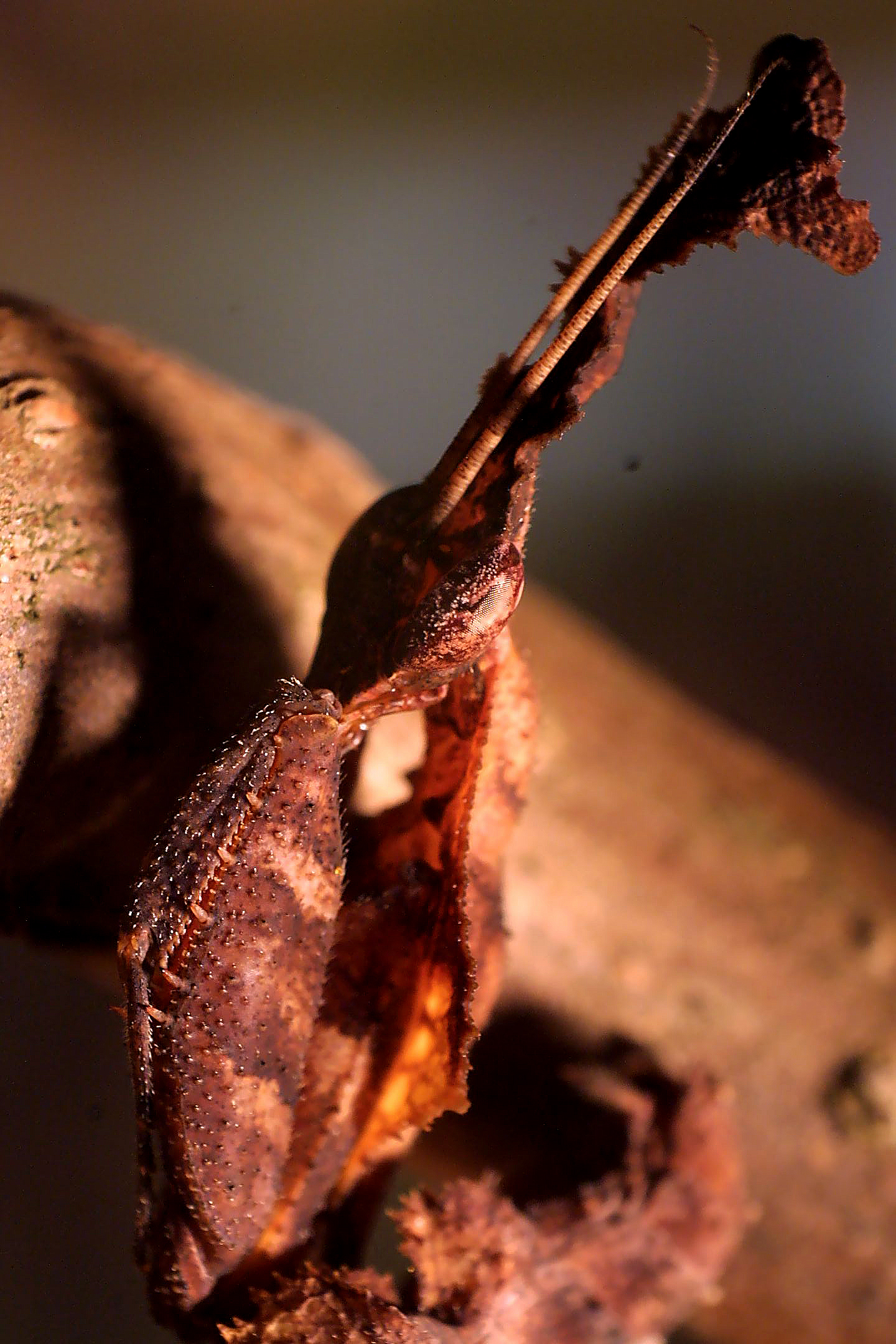
Male Phyllocrania paradoxa, probably subadult

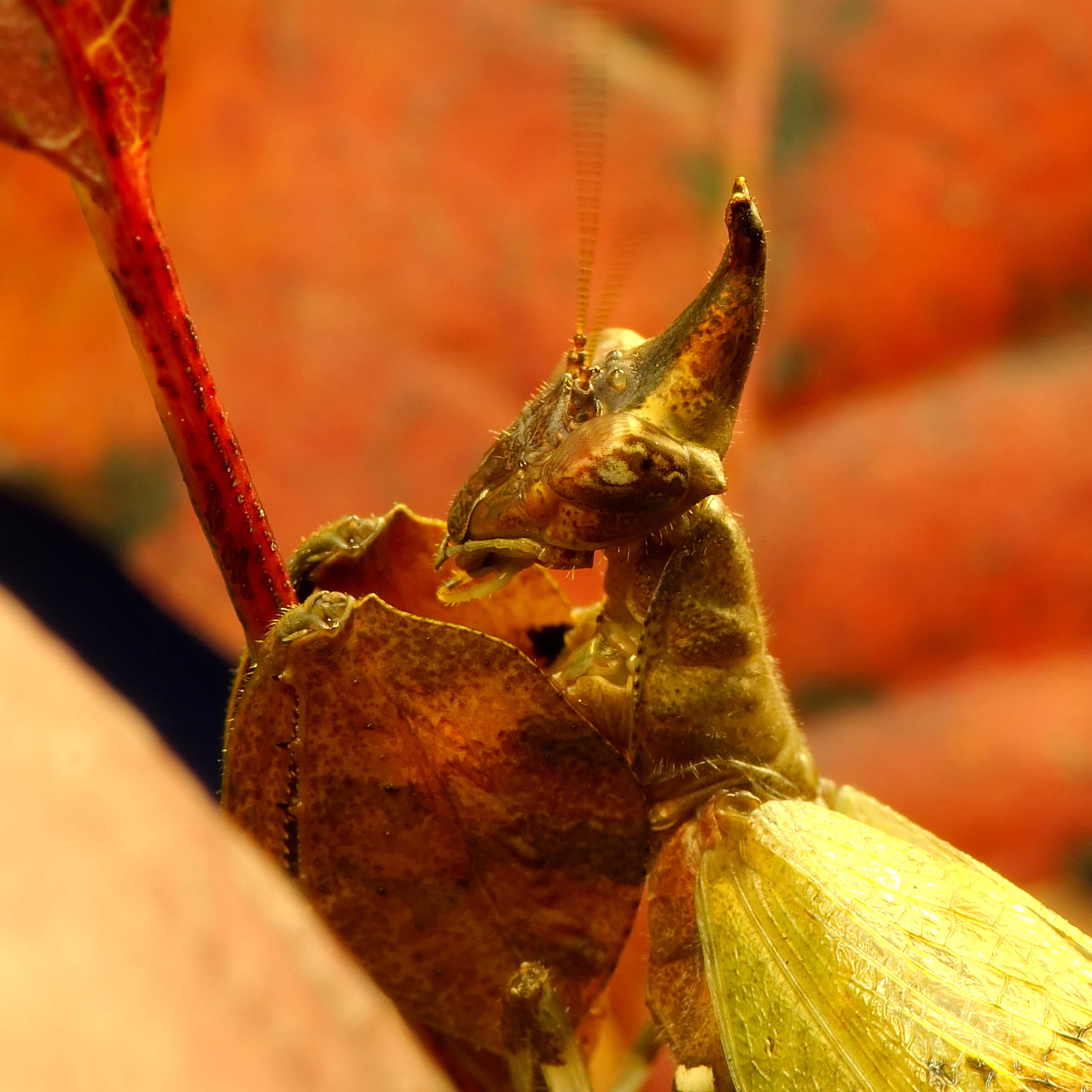
Adult female Hestiasula brunneriana

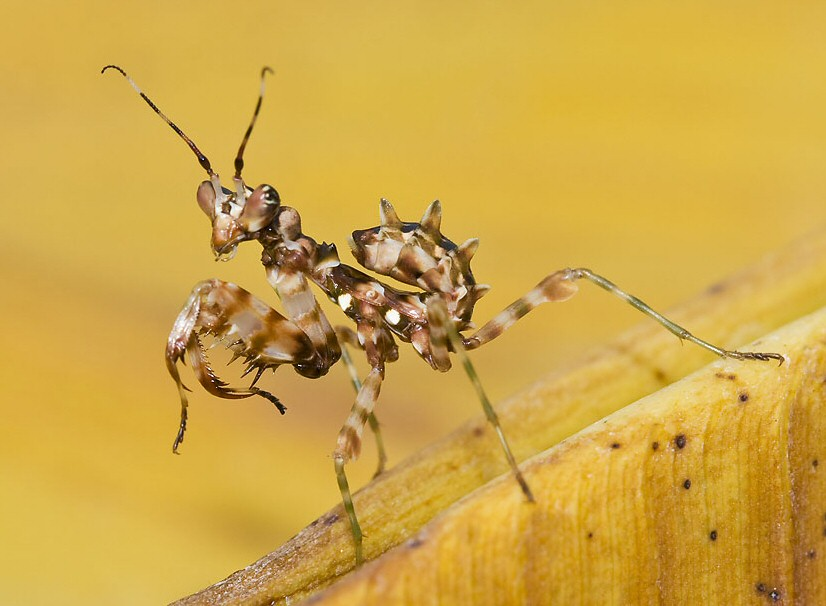
Pseudocreobotra ocellata nymph

== See also ==
- List of mantis genera and species
