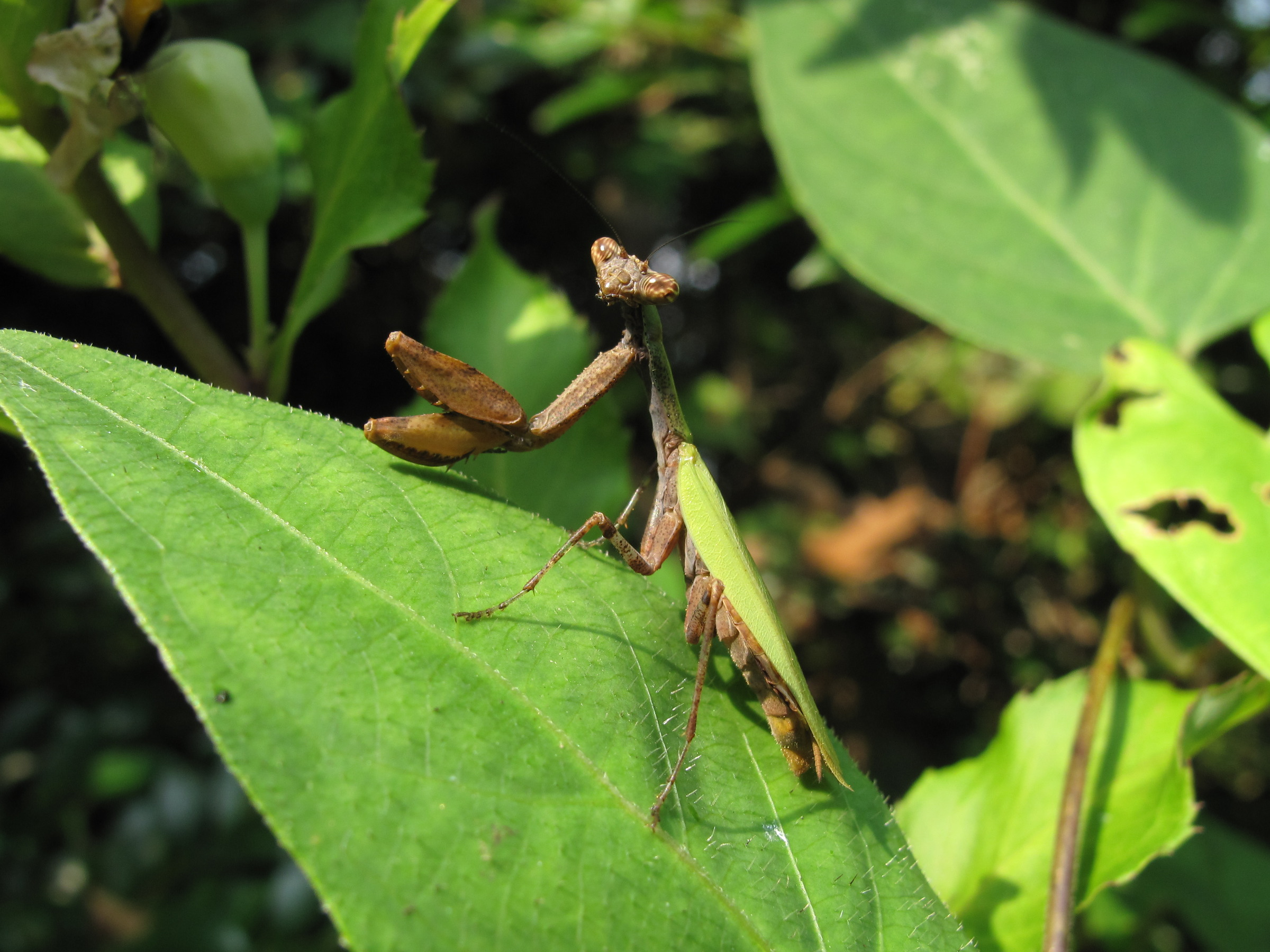
- Adult female Acromantis japonica

Scientific classification
- Kingdom: Animalia
- Phylum: Arthropoda
- Clade: Pancrustacea
- Class: Insecta
- Order: Mantodea
- Family: Hymenopodidae
- Subfamily: Acromantinae
- Tribe: Acromantini

Genera
- Acromantis (Saussure, 1870); Ambivia Stal, 1877; Citharomantis (Rehn, 1909); Majangella Giglio-Tos, 1915; Metacromantis (Beier, 1930); Oligomantis (Giglio-Tos, 1915); Parapsychomantis Shcherbakov, 2017; Psychomantis (Giglio-Tos, 1915); Rhomantis (Giglio-Tos, 1915)

= Acromantini =

Tribe of praying mantises

Acromantini is a tribe of mantis in the family Hymenopodidae, which contains 9 genera and 35 species:

- Acromantis (Saussure, 1870)
  - Acromantis australis (Saussure, 1871)
  - Acromantis dyaka (Hebard, 1920)
  - Acromantis elegans (Lombardo, 1993)
  - Acromantis formosana (Shiraki, 1911)
  - Acromantis gestri (Giglio-Tos, 1915)
  - Acromantis grandis (Beier, 1930)
  - Acromantis hesione (Stal, 1877)
  - Acromantis indica (Giglio-Tos, 1915)
  - Acromantis insularis (Giglio-Tos, 1915)
  - Acromantis japonica (Westwood, 1889)
  - Acromantis lilii (Werner, 1922)
  - Acromantis luzonica (Hebard, 1920)
  - Acromantis montana (Giglio-Tos, 1915)
  - Acromantis moultoni (Giglio-Tos, 1915)
  - Acromantis nicobarica (Mukherjee, 1995)
  - Acromantis oligoneura (Haan, 1942)
  - Acromantis palauana (Beier, 1972)
  - Acromantis philippina (Beier, 1966)
  - Acromantis satsumensis (Matsumura, 1913)
  - Acromantis siporana (Giglio-Tos, 1915)
- Ambivia Stal, 1877
  - Ambivia parapopa Wang, 1993
  - Ambivia popa Stal, 1877
- Citharomantis (Rehn, 1909)
  - Citharomantis falcata (Rehn, 1909)
- Majangella Giglio-Tos, 1915
  - Majangella carli Giglio-Tos, 1915
  - Majangella moultoni Giglio-Tos, 1915
  - Majangella ophirensis Werner, 1922
- Metacromantis (Beier, 1930)
  - Metacromantis nigrofemorata (Ghate, Thulsi Ra, Maqsood Javed & Roy, 2006)
  - Metacromantis oxyops (Beier, 1930)
- Oligomantis (Giglio-Tos, 1915)
  - Oligomantis hyalina (Werner, 1916)
  - Oligomantis mentaweiana (Giglio-Tos, 1915)
  - Oligomantis orientalis (Giglio-Tos, 1915)
- Parapsychomantis Shcherbakov, 2017
  - Parapsychomantis vietnamensis Shcherbakov, 2017
- Psychomantis (Giglio-Tos, 1915)
  - Psychomantis borneensis (Haan, 1842)
  - Psychomantis malayensis (Beier, 1931)
- Rhomantis (Giglio-Tos, 1915)
  - Rhomantis moultoni (Giglio-Tos)

== See also ==
- List of mantis genera and species
