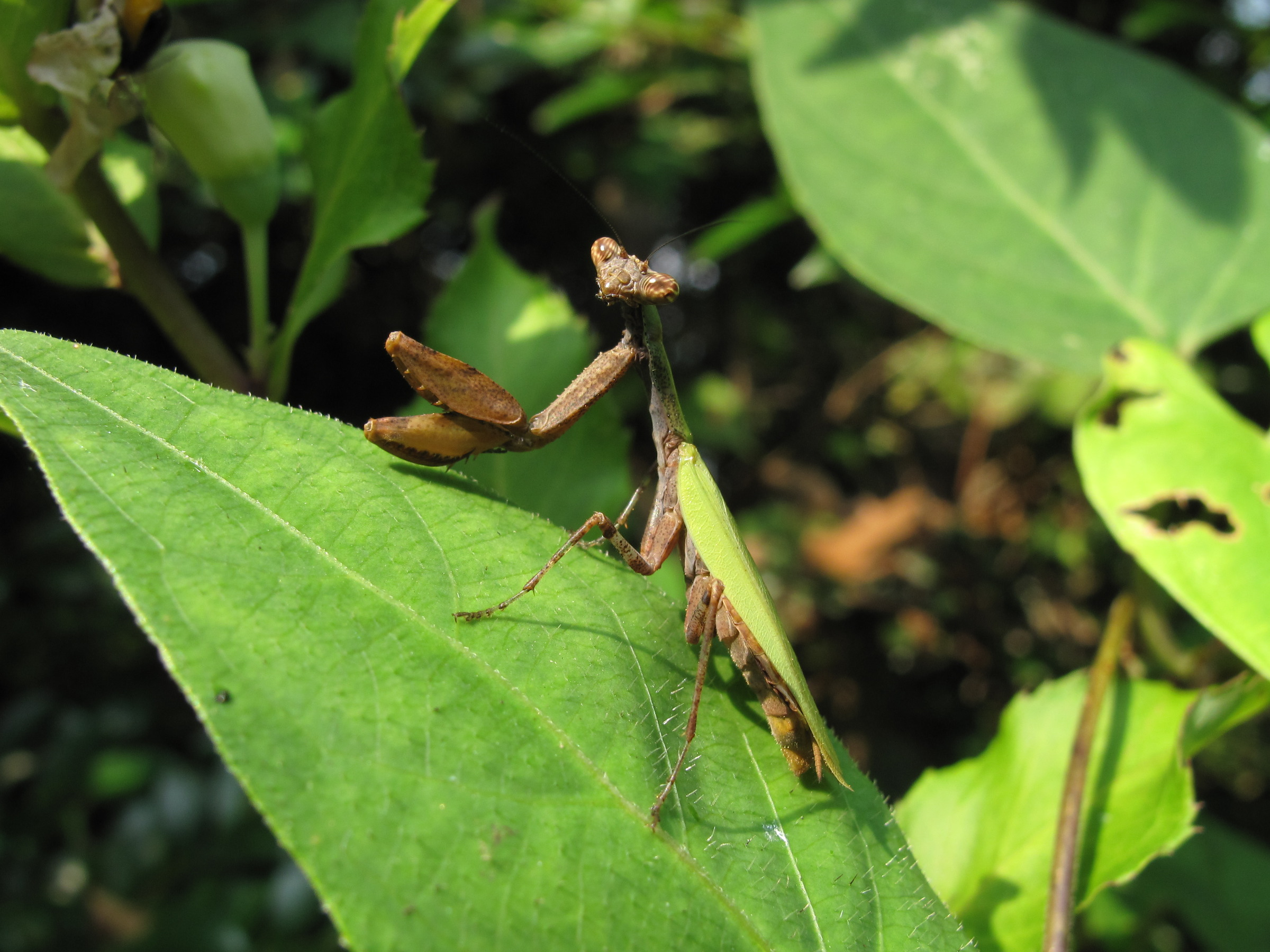
- Adult female Acromantis japonica

Scientific classification
- Kingdom: Animalia
- Phylum: Arthropoda
- Clade: Pancrustacea
- Class: Insecta
- Order: Mantodea
- Family: Hymenopodidae
- Subfamily: Acromantinae; Giglio-Tos, 1919

Tribes
- Acromantini; Otomantini

= Acromantinae =

Subfamily of praying mantises

Acromantinae is a subfamily of the mantis family Hymenopodidae which contains two tribes and about 13 genera.

== Tribes and genera ==
The Mantodea Species File lists:

Tribe Acromantini

- Acromantis Saussure, 1870
- Ambivia Stal, 1877
- Citharomantis Rehn, 1909
- Majangella Giglio-Tos, 1915, synonym: Ephippiomantis Werner, 1922
- Metacromantis Beier, 1930
- Oligomantis Giglio-Tos, 1915
- Parapsychomantis Shcherbakov, 2017
- Psychomantis Giglio-Tos, 1915
- Rhomantis Giglio-Tos, 1915

Tribe Otomantini

- Anasigerpes Giglio-Tos, 1915
- Chrysomantis Giglio-Tos, 1915, synonym: Anoplosigerpes Werner, 1928
- Otomantis Bolivar, 1890
- Oxypiloidea Schulthess, 1898

Now placed elsewhere:

- Anaxarcha Stal, 1877 (in Hymenopodinae)
- Ephestiasula Giglio-Tos, 1915 (in Oxypilinae, synonym: Parahestiasula Lombardo, 1995)
- Heliomantis Giglio-Tos, 1915 (in Hymenopodinae)
- Hestiasula Saussure, 1871 (in Oxypilinae)
- Odontomantis Saussure, 1871 (in Hymenopodinae)

== See also ==
- List of mantis genera and species
