= A. alluaudi =

A. alluaudi may refer to:

- Abacetus alluaudi, an African ground beetle
- Agrotis alluaudi, a French moth
- Amphiglossus alluaudi, a synonym of Flexiseps alluaudi, a Madagascar skink
- Anasigerpes alluaudi, a synonym of Anasigerpes heydeni, a West African praying mantis
- Assinia alluaudi, a longhorn beetle
- Astatoreochromis alluaudi, Alluaud's haplo, an East African freshwater fish
