= Boxer mantis =

Common name for several praying mantises

Boxer mantis is a common name given to various species of praying mantises. The name comes from the way these mantises move their oversized grasping forelimbs as they communicate with each other.

== Communication ==
When boxer mantises encounter one another, they rapidly tremble their forelimbs, displaying their patterned interior faces to each other and waving them in slow arcs. This is believed to be a way of preventing members of the same species from eating each other.

== Species ==
- Acromantis gestri Giglio-Tos, 1915 (Thai boxer mantis, Thailand boxer mantis, Sumatran Acromantis)
- Acromantis japonica Westwood, 1889 (Japanese boxer mantis)
- Astyliasula major
- Ephestiasula pictipes (purple boxer mantis)
- Otomantis sp.
- Oxypilus distinctus (Beier, 1930) (Gambian boxer mantis)
- Theopropus elegans (banded flower mantis, Asian boxer mantis)

== See also ==
- Dead leaf mantis
- Flower mantis
- Grass mantis
- Leaf mantis
- Shield mantis
- Stick mantis
- List of mantis genera and species
