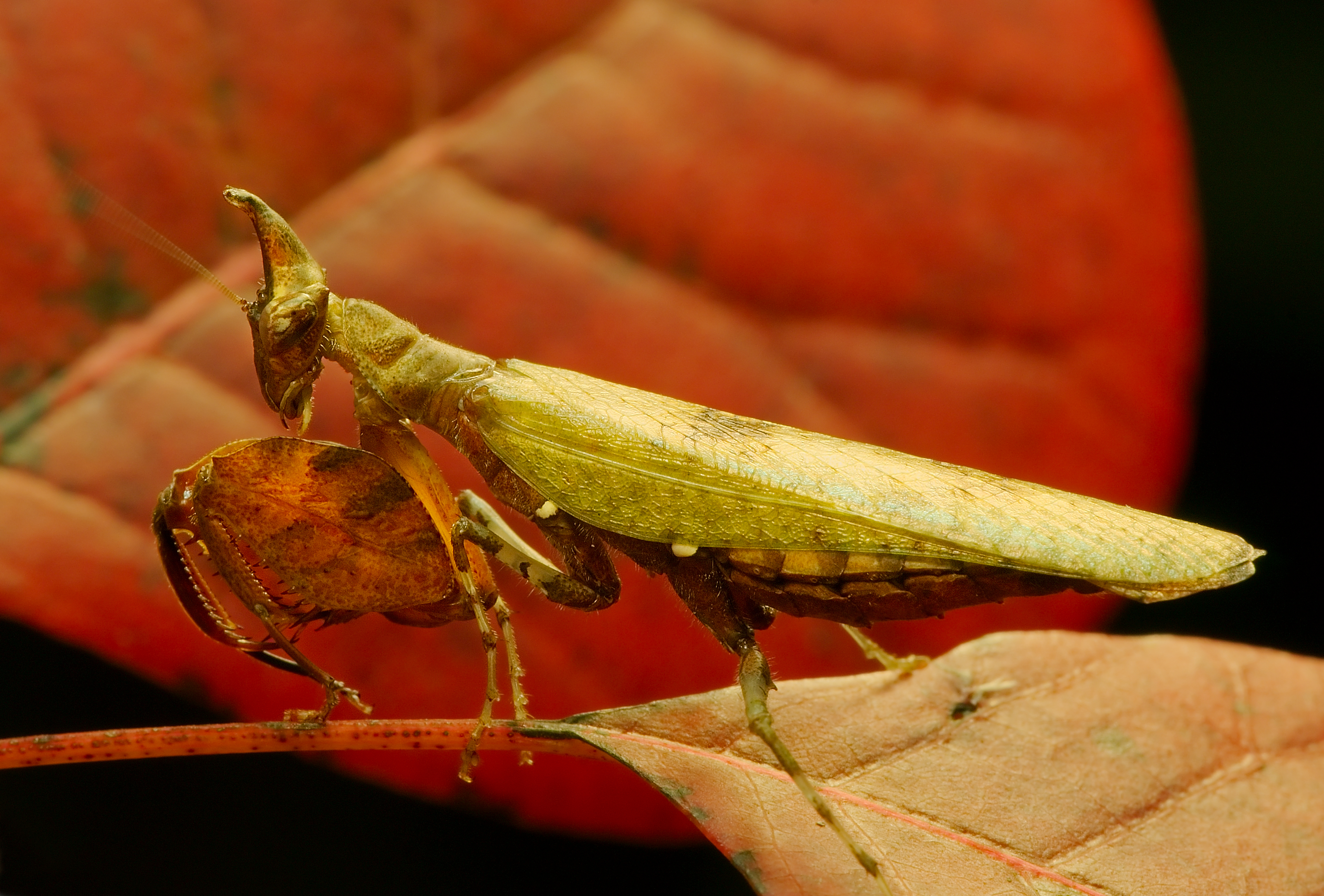

Scientific classification
- Domain: Eukaryota
- Kingdom: Animalia
- Phylum: Arthropoda
- Class: Insecta
- Order: Mantodea
- Family: Hymenopodidae
- Genus: Hestiasula
- Species: H. brunneriana

Binomial name
- Hestiasula brunneriana Saussure, 1871

= Hestiasula brunneriana =

Species of praying mantis

Hestiasula brunneriana is a species of praying mantis in the subfamily Acromantinae in the family Hymenopodidae.
