= Oxypiloidea margarethae =

Scientific classification
- Kingdom: Animalia
- Phylum: Arthropoda
- Clade: Pancrustacea
- Class: Insecta
- Order: Mantodea
- Family: Hymenopodidae
- Genus: Oxypiloidea
- Species: O. margarethae

Binomial name
- Oxypiloidea margarethae Werner, 1912

Synonyms
- Catasigerpes margarethae (Werner, 1912); Oxypiloidea niloticus (Giglio-Tos, 1915)

Species of praying mantis

Oxypiloidea margarethae is a species of praying mantis in the family Hymenopodidae.

== See also ==
- List of mantis genera and species
