= Anaxarcha acuta =

Scientific classification
- Kingdom: Animalia
- Phylum: Arthropoda
- Clade: Pancrustacea
- Class: Insecta
- Order: Mantodea
- Family: Hymenopodidae
- Genus: Anaxarcha
- Species: A. acuta

Binomial name
- Anaxarcha acuta Beier, 1963

Species of praying mantis

Anaxarcha acuta is a species of praying mantis found in India.

== See also ==
- List of mantis genera and species
