= Catestiasula moultoni =

Scientific classification
- Kingdom: Animalia
- Phylum: Arthropoda
- Class: Insecta
- Order: Mantodea
- Family: Hymenopodidae
- Genus: Catestiasula
- Species: C. moultoni

Binomial name
- Catestiasula moultoni Giglio-Tos, 1915

Synonyms
- Hestiasula moultoni (Giglio-Tos, 1915)

Species of praying mantis

Catestiasula moultoni is a species of praying mantis in the family Hymenopodidae.

== See also ==
- List of mantis genera and species
