= Oxypiloidea mortuifolia =

Scientific classification
- Kingdom: Animalia
- Phylum: Arthropoda
- Clade: Pancrustacea
- Class: Insecta
- Order: Mantodea
- Family: Hymenopodidae
- Genus: Oxypiloidea
- Species: O. mortuifolia

Binomial name
- Oxypiloidea mortuifolia (Saussure, 1899)

Synonyms
- Catasigerpes mortuifolia (Saussure, 1899)

Species of praying mantis

Oxypiloidea mortuifolia is a species of praying mantis in the family Hymenopodidae.

== See also ==
- List of mantis genera and species
