= Anaxarcha intermedia =

Scientific classification
- Kingdom: Animalia
- Phylum: Arthropoda
- Clade: Pancrustacea
- Class: Insecta
- Order: Mantodea
- Family: Hymenopodidae
- Genus: Anaxarcha
- Species: A. intermedia

Binomial name
- Anaxarcha intermedia Mukherjee, 1995

Species of praying mantis

Anaxarcha intermedia is a species of praying mantis found in India.

== See also ==
- List of mantis genera and species
