= Hestiasula woodi =

Scientific classification
- Kingdom: Animalia
- Phylum: Arthropoda
- Class: Insecta
- Order: Mantodea
- Family: Hymenopodidae
- Genus: Hestiasula
- Species: H. woodi

Binomial name
- Hestiasula woodi Giglio-Tos, 1915

Species of praying mantis

Hestiasula woodi is a species of praying mantis in the family Hymenopodidae.

== See also ==
- List of mantis genera and species
