= Chrysomantis cachani =

Scientific classification
- Kingdom: Animalia
- Phylum: Arthropoda
- Clade: Pancrustacea
- Class: Insecta
- Order: Mantodea
- Family: Hymenopodidae
- Genus: Chrysomantis
- Species: C. cachani

Binomial name
- Chrysomantis cachani Roy, 1964

Species of praying mantis

Chrysomantis cachani is a species of praying mantis found in West Africa (Côte d'Ivoire, Ghana, Guinea) and the Congo River region.

== See also ==
- List of mantis genera and species
