= Oxypiloidea camerunensis =

Scientific classification
- Kingdom: Animalia
- Phylum: Arthropoda
- Clade: Pancrustacea
- Class: Insecta
- Order: Mantodea
- Family: Hymenopodidae
- Genus: Oxypiloidea
- Species: O. camerunensis

Binomial name
- Oxypiloidea camerunensis (Giglio-Tos, 1915)

Synonyms
- Catasigerpes camerunensis (Giglio-Tos, 1915)

Species of praying mantis

Oxypiloidea camerunensis is a species of praying mantis in the family Hymenopodidae. It is native to Cameroon in West Africa.

== See also ==
- List of mantis genera and species
