= Anaxarcha graminea =

Scientific classification
- Kingdom: Animalia
- Phylum: Arthropoda
- Clade: Pancrustacea
- Class: Insecta
- Order: Mantodea
- Family: Hymenopodidae
- Genus: Anaxarcha
- Species: A. graminea

Binomial name
- Anaxarcha graminea Stål, 1877

Synonyms
- Anaxarcha grammica Stal, 1877

Species of praying mantis

Anaxarcha graminea is a species of praying mantis found in India and Malaysia.

== See also ==
- List of mantis genera and species
