= Catestiasula =

Scientific classification
- Kingdom: Animalia
- Phylum: Arthropoda
- Class: Insecta
- Order: Mantodea
- Family: Hymenopodidae
- Tribe: Hestiasulini
- Genus: Catestiasula; Giglio-Tos, 1915

Genus of mantises

Catestiasula is a genus of praying mantises belonging to the family Hymenopodidae.

Species:

- Catestiasula moultoni Giglio-Tos, 1915
- Catestiasula nitida (Brunner, 1893)
- Catestiasula seminigra Zhang, 1992
