= Oxypiloidea acuminata =

Scientific classification
- Domain: Eukaryota
- Kingdom: Animalia
- Phylum: Arthropoda
- Class: Insecta
- Order: Mantodea
- Family: Hymenopodidae
- Genus: Oxypiloidea
- Species: O. acuminata

Binomial name
- Oxypiloidea acuminata (Kevan, 1954)

Synonyms
- Catasigerpes acuminatus Kevan, 1954

Species of praying mantis

Oxypiloidea acuminata is a species of praying mantis in the family Hymenopodidae.

== See also ==
- List of mantis genera and species
