= Astyliasula inermis =

Scientific classification
- Domain: Eukaryota
- Kingdom: Animalia
- Phylum: Arthropoda
- Class: Insecta
- Order: Mantodea
- Family: Hymenopodidae
- Genus: Astyliasula
- Species: A. inermis

Binomial name
- Astyliasula inermis (Wood-Mason, 1879)

Synonyms
- Hestiasula inermis Wood-Mason, 1879

Species of praying mantis

Hestiasula inermis is a species of praying mantis in the family Hymenopodidae.

== See also ==
- List of mantis genera and species
