= Oxypiloidea brunneriana =

Scientific classification
- Domain: Eukaryota
- Kingdom: Animalia
- Phylum: Arthropoda
- Class: Insecta
- Order: Mantodea
- Family: Hymenopodidae
- Genus: Oxypiloidea
- Species: O. brunneriana

Binomial name
- Oxypiloidea brunneriana (Saussure, 1871)

Synonyms
- Catasigerpes brunnerianus (Saussure, 1871)

Species of praying mantis

Oxypiloidea brunneriana is a species of praying mantis in the family Hymenopodidae.

== See also ==
- List of mantis genera and species
