= Astyliasula hoffmanni =

Scientific classification
- Domain: Eukaryota
- Kingdom: Animalia
- Phylum: Arthropoda
- Class: Insecta
- Order: Mantodea
- Family: Hymenopodidae
- Genus: Astyliasula
- Species: A. hoffmanni

Binomial name
- Astyliasula hoffmanni (Tinkham, 1937)

Synonyms
- Hestiasula hoffmanni Tinkham, 1937

Species of praying mantis

Astyliasula hoffmanni is a species of praying mantis in the family Hymenopodidae.

== See also ==
- List of mantis genera and species
