= Oxypiloidea jeanneli =

Scientific classification
- Kingdom: Animalia
- Phylum: Arthropoda
- Clade: Pancrustacea
- Class: Insecta
- Order: Mantodea
- Family: Hymenopodidae
- Genus: Oxypiloidea
- Species: O. jeanneli

Binomial name
- Oxypiloidea jeanneli (Chopard, 1938)

Synonyms
- Catasigerpes jeanneli Chopard, 1938

Species of praying mantis

Oxypiloidea jeanneli is a species of praying mantis in the family Hymenopodidae.

== See also ==
- List of mantis genera and species
