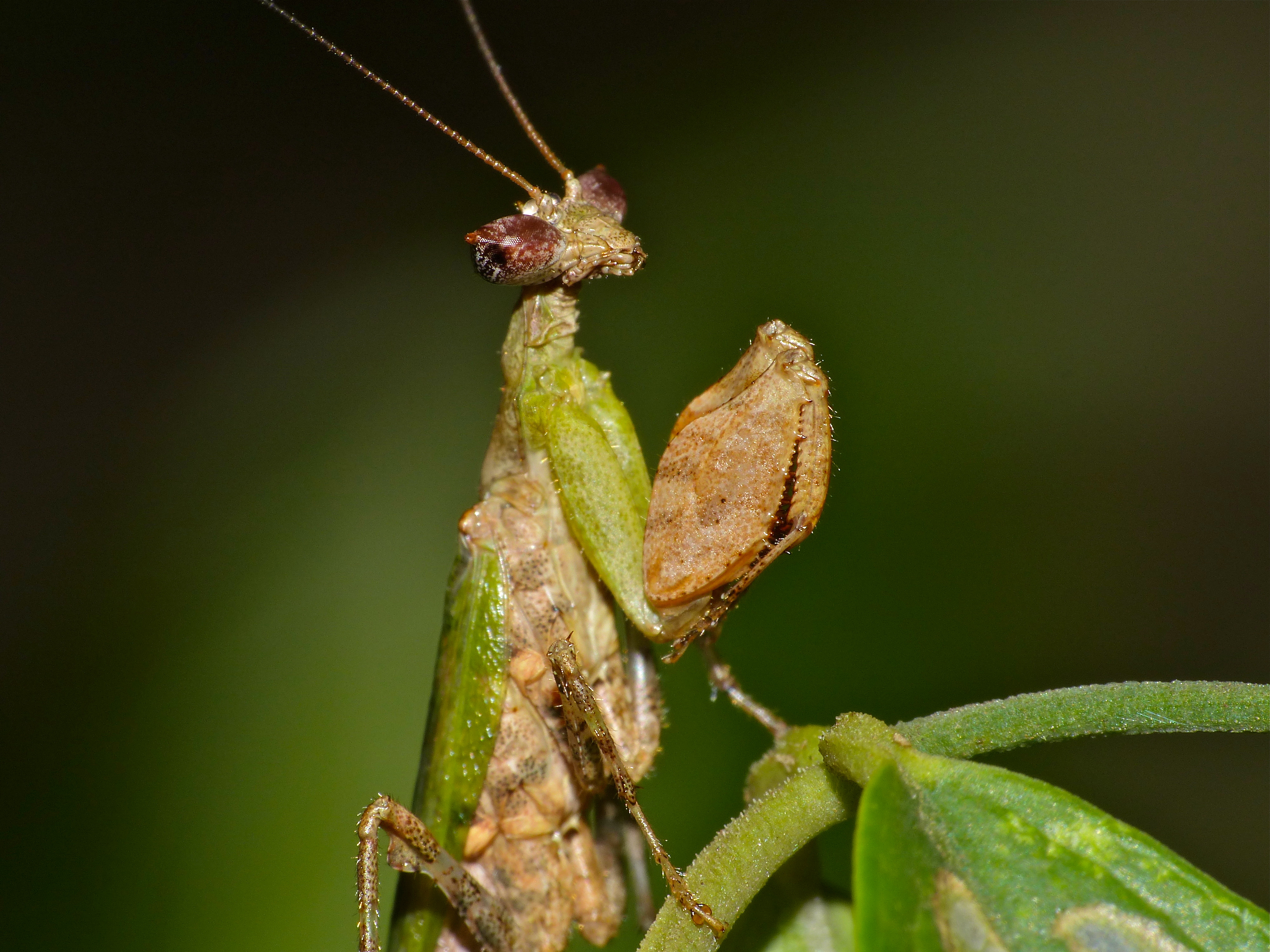
- Otomantis scutigera

Scientific classification
- Kingdom: Animalia
- Phylum: Arthropoda
- Clade: Pancrustacea
- Class: Insecta
- Order: Mantodea
- Family: Hymenopodidae
- Subfamily: Acromantinae
- Tribe: Otomantini

Genera
- Anasigerpes Giglio-Tos, 1915; Chrysomantis Giglio-Tos, 1915; Otomantis Bolivar, 1890; Oxypiloidea Schulthess, 1898

= Otomantini =

Tribe of praying mantises

Otomantini is a tribe of praying mantis in the family Hymenopodidae. It contains 48 species within four genera.

== See also ==
- List of mantis genera and species
