= Assinia pumilio =

Scientific classification
- Kingdom: Animalia
- Phylum: Arthropoda
- Class: Insecta
- Order: Coleoptera
- Suborder: Polyphaga
- Infraorder: Cucujiformia
- Family: Cerambycidae
- Genus: Assinia
- Species: A. pumilio

Binomial name
- Assinia pumilio (Kolbe, 1893)

Species of beetle

Assinia pumilio is a species of beetle in the family Cerambycidae. It was described by Kolbe in 1893.
