= Assinia affinis =

Scientific classification
- Kingdom: Animalia
- Phylum: Arthropoda
- Class: Insecta
- Order: Coleoptera
- Suborder: Polyphaga
- Infraorder: Cucujiformia
- Family: Cerambycidae
- Genus: Assinia
- Species: A. affinis

Binomial name
- Assinia affinis Téocchi & Sudre, 2002

Species of beetle

Assinia affinis is a species of beetle in the family Cerambycidae. It was described by Téocchi and Sudre in 2002.
