= Hestiasula nigrofemorata =

Scientific classification
- Domain: Eukaryota
- Kingdom: Animalia
- Phylum: Arthropoda
- Class: Insecta
- Order: Mantodea
- Family: Hymenopodidae
- Genus: Hestiasula
- Species: H. nigrofemorata

Binomial name
- Hestiasula nigrofemorata Werner, 1930

Species of praying mantis

Hestiasula nigrofemorata is a species of praying mantis in the family Hymenopodidae.

== See also ==
- List of mantis genera and species
