= Astyliasula =

Scientific classification
- Kingdom: Animalia
- Phylum: Arthropoda
- Clade: Pancrustacea
- Class: Insecta
- Order: Mantodea
- Family: Hymenopodidae
- Tribe: Hestiasulini
- Genus: Astyliasula; Schwarz & Shcherbakov, 2017

Genus of mantises

Astyliasula is a genus of mantises belonging to the family Hymenopodidae.

The species of this genus are found in Southeastern Asia.

Species:

- Astyliasula basinigra (Zhang, 1992)
- Astyliasula hoffmanni (Tinkham, 1937)
- Astyliasula inermis (Wood-Mason, 1879)
- Astyliasula javana (Beier, 1929)
- Astyliasula major (Beier, 1929)
- Astyliasula phyllopus (Haan, 1842)
- Astyliasula sarawaca (Westwood, 1889)
- Astyliasula wuyshana Yang & Wang
