= Astyliasula phyllopus =

Scientific classification
- Kingdom: Animalia
- Phylum: Arthropoda
- Clade: Pancrustacea
- Class: Insecta
- Order: Mantodea
- Family: Hymenopodidae
- Genus: Astyliasula
- Species: A. phyllopus

Binomial name
- Astyliasula phyllopus (Haan, 1842)

Synonyms
- Hestiasula phyllopus Haan, 1842

Species of praying mantis

Astyliasula phyllopus, the leaf-footed astyliasula, is a species of mantis in the family Hymenopodidae.

== See also ==
- List of mantis genera and species
