= Astyliasula basinigra =

Scientific classification
- Domain: Eukaryota
- Kingdom: Animalia
- Phylum: Arthropoda
- Class: Insecta
- Order: Mantodea
- Family: Hymenopodidae
- Genus: Astyliasula
- Species: A. basinigra

Binomial name
- Astyliasula basinigra (Zhang, 1992)

Synonyms
- Hestiasula basinigra Zhang, 1992

Species of praying mantis

Astyliasula basinigra is a species of praying mantis in the family Hymenopodidae.

== See also ==
- List of mantis genera and species
