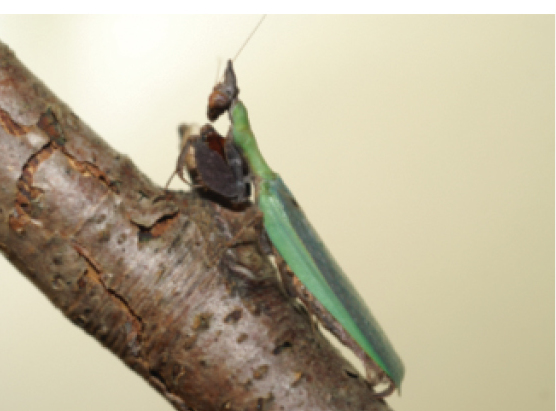

Scientific classification
- Kingdom: Animalia
- Phylum: Arthropoda
- Clade: Pancrustacea
- Class: Insecta
- Order: Mantodea
- Family: Hymenopodidae
- Genus: Anasigerpes
- Species: A. bifasciata

Binomial name
- Anasigerpes bifasciata Giglio-Tos, 1915

= Anasigerpes bifasciata =

Species of praying mantis

Anasigerpes bifasciata is a species of praying mantis in the family Hymenopodidae.

== See also ==
- List of mantis genera and species
