= Anasigerpes amieti =

Scientific classification
- Kingdom: Animalia
- Phylum: Arthropoda
- Clade: Pancrustacea
- Class: Insecta
- Order: Mantodea
- Family: Hymenopodidae
- Genus: Anasigerpes
- Species: A. amieti

Binomial name
- Anasigerpes amieti Roy, 1963

Species of praying mantis

Anasigerpes amieti is a species of praying mantis in the family Hymenopodidae.

== See also ==
- List of mantis genera and species
