= Assinia =

Scientific classification
- Kingdom: Animalia
- Phylum: Arthropoda
- Class: Insecta
- Order: Coleoptera
- Suborder: Polyphaga
- Infraorder: Cucujiformia
- Family: Cerambycidae
- Subfamily: Lamiinae
- Tribe: Apomecynini
- Genus: Assinia; Lameere, 1893

Genus of beetles

Assinia is a genus of beetles in the family Cerambycidae, containing the following species:

- Assinia affinis Téocchi & Sudre, 2002
- Assinia alluaudi Lameere, 1893
- Assinia inermis (Aurivillius, 1908)
- Assinia pulchra Breuning, 1940
- Assinia pumilio (Kolbe, 1893)
