= Hestiasula zhejiangensis =

Scientific classification
- Domain: Eukaryota
- Kingdom: Animalia
- Phylum: Arthropoda
- Class: Insecta
- Order: Mantodea
- Family: Hymenopodidae
- Genus: Hestiasula
- Species: H. zhejiangensis

Binomial name
- Hestiasula zhejiangensis Zhou & Shen, 1992

Species of praying mantis

Hestiasula zhejiangensis is a species of praying mantis in the family Hymenopodidae.

== See also ==
- List of mantis genera and species
