= Oxypiloidea occidentalis =

Scientific classification
- Kingdom: Animalia
- Phylum: Arthropoda
- Clade: Pancrustacea
- Class: Insecta
- Order: Mantodea
- Family: Hymenopodidae
- Genus: Oxypiloidea
- Species: O. occidentalis

Binomial name
- Oxypiloidea occidentalis (Wood-Mason, 1879)

Synonyms
- Catasigerpes occidentalis (Wood-Mason, 1879); Catasigerpes toganus (Giglio-Tos, 1915)

Species of praying mantis

Catasigerpes occidentalis is a species of praying mantis in the family Hymenopodidae.

== See also ==
- List of mantis genera and species
