= Oxypiloidea lobata =

Scientific classification
- Kingdom: Animalia
- Phylum: Arthropoda
- Clade: Pancrustacea
- Class: Insecta
- Order: Mantodea
- Family: Hymenopodidae
- Genus: Oxypiloidea
- Species: O. lobata

Binomial name
- Oxypiloidea lobata (Schulthess-Schindler, 1898)

Synonyms
- Catasigerpes erlangeri (Beier, 1931)

Species of praying mantis

Oxypiloidea lobata is a species of praying mantis in the family Hymenopodidae.

== See also ==
- List of mantis genera and species
