= Oxypiloidea nigerica =

Scientific classification
- Kingdom: Animalia
- Phylum: Arthropoda
- Clade: Pancrustacea
- Class: Insecta
- Order: Mantodea
- Family: Hymenopodidae
- Genus: Oxypiloidea
- Species: O. nigerica

Binomial name
- Oxypiloidea nigerica (Giglio-Tos, 1915)

Synonyms
- Catasigerpes nigericus Giglio-Tos, 1915

Species of praying mantis

Oxypiloidea nigerica is a species of praying mantis in the family Hymenopodidae. It is native to Nigeria.

== See also ==
- List of mantis genera and species
