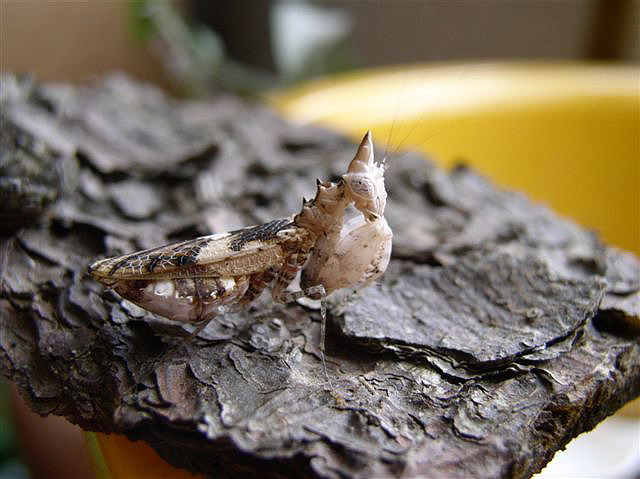

Scientific classification
- Kingdom: Animalia
- Phylum: Arthropoda
- Clade: Pancrustacea
- Class: Insecta
- Order: Mantodea
- Family: Hymenopodidae
- Tribe: Oxypilini
- Genus: Ceratomantis; Wood-Mason, 1876

= Ceratomantis =

Genus of mantises

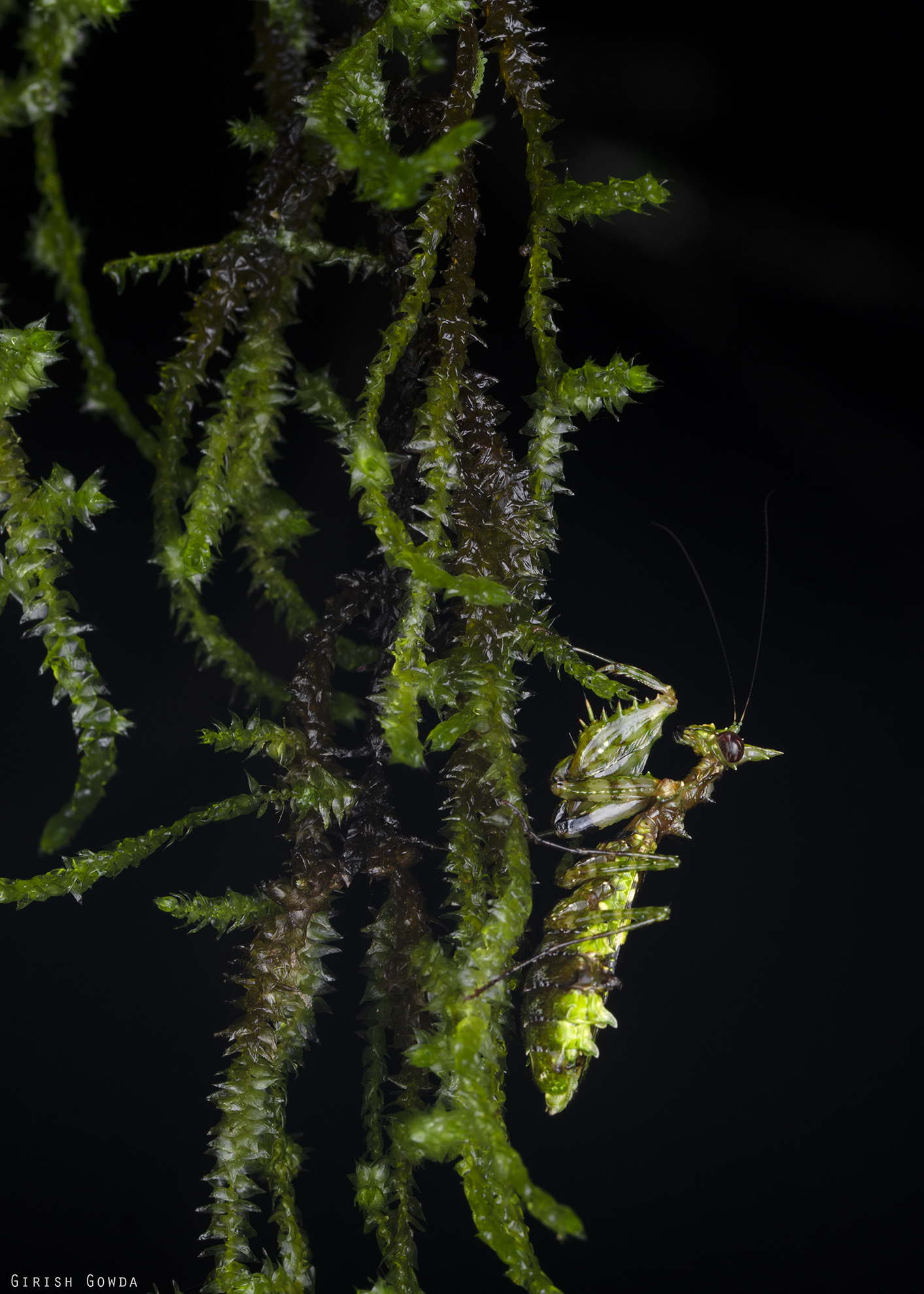
Ceratomantis ghatei from Agumbe, Karnataka, India

Ceratomantis is an Asian genus of praying mantises in the family Hymenopodidae.

== Species ==
The Catalogue of Life lists:

- Ceratomantis ghatei
- Ceratomantis gigliotosi
- Ceratomantis kimberlae
- Ceratomantis saussurii
- Ceratomantis yunnanensis
