= Junodia strigipennis =

Scientific classification
- Kingdom: Animalia
- Phylum: Arthropoda
- Clade: Pancrustacea
- Class: Insecta
- Order: Mantodea
- Family: Hymenopodidae
- Genus: Junodia
- Species: J. strigipennis

Binomial name
- Junodia strigipennis Westwood, 1889

Synonyms
- Oxypilus strigipennis

Species of praying mantis

Junodia strigipennis is a species of praying mantis found Ethiopia, Mozambique, South Africa, Tanzania, and Zimbabwe. It was previously identified as Oxypilus strigipennis.

== See also ==
- List of mantis genera and species
