= Hestiasula kastneri =

Scientific classification
- Domain: Eukaryota
- Kingdom: Animalia
- Phylum: Arthropoda
- Class: Insecta
- Order: Mantodea
- Family: Hymenopodidae
- Genus: Hestiasula
- Species: H. kastneri

Binomial name
- Hestiasula kastneri Beier, 1942

Species of praying mantis

Hestiasula kastneri is a species of praying mantis in the genus Hestiasula in the order Mantodea.

== See also ==
- List of mantis genera and species
