= Junodia hararensis =

Scientific classification
- Kingdom: Animalia
- Phylum: Arthropoda
- Clade: Pancrustacea
- Class: Insecta
- Order: Mantodea
- Family: Hymenopodidae
- Genus: Junodia
- Species: J. hararensis

Binomial name
- Junodia hararensis Roy, 1972

Species of praying mantis

Junodia hararensis is a species of praying mantis found in Ethiopia and Somalia.

== See also ==
- List of mantis genera and species
