= Anaxarcha sinensis =

Scientific classification
- Kingdom: Animalia
- Phylum: Arthropoda
- Clade: Pancrustacea
- Class: Insecta
- Order: Mantodea
- Family: Hymenopodidae
- Genus: Anaxarcha
- Species: A. sinensis

Binomial name
- Anaxarcha sinensis Beier, 1933

Species of praying mantis

Anaxarcha sinensis is a species of praying mantis found in China.

== See also ==
- List of mantis genera and species
