= Junodia lameyi =

Scientific classification
- Kingdom: Animalia
- Phylum: Arthropoda
- Clade: Pancrustacea
- Class: Insecta
- Order: Mantodea
- Family: Hymenopodidae
- Genus: Junodia
- Species: J. lameyi

Binomial name
- Junodia lameyi Beier, 1942

Synonyms
- Junodia olseni Roy, 1965

Species of praying mantis

Junodia lameyi is a species of praying mantis found in Angola, Côte d'Ivoire, Ghana, Guinea, Cameroon and the Congo River region.

== See also ==
- List of mantis genera and species
