= Junodia beieri =

Scientific classification
- Kingdom: Animalia
- Phylum: Arthropoda
- Clade: Pancrustacea
- Class: Insecta
- Order: Mantodea
- Family: Hymenopodidae
- Genus: Junodia
- Species: J. beieri

Binomial name
- Junodia beieri Roy, 1972

Species of praying mantis

Junodia beieri is a species of praying mantis found in the Congo River region.

== See also ==
- List of mantis genera and species
