= Junodia amoena =

Scientific classification
- Kingdom: Animalia
- Phylum: Arthropoda
- Clade: Pancrustacea
- Class: Insecta
- Order: Mantodea
- Family: Hymenopodidae
- Genus: Junodia
- Species: J. amoena

Binomial name
- Junodia amoena Schulthess-Rechberg, 1899

Species of praying mantis

Junodia amoena is a species of praying mantis found in Ethiopia, Kenya, Mozambique, and Tanzania.

== See also ==
- List of mantis genera and species
