= Anasigerpes centralis =

Scientific classification
- Kingdom: Animalia
- Phylum: Arthropoda
- Clade: Pancrustacea
- Class: Insecta
- Order: Mantodea
- Family: Hymenopodidae
- Genus: Anasigerpes
- Species: A. centralis

Binomial name
- Anasigerpes centralis Roy, 1966

Species of praying mantis

Anasigerpes centralis, the central anasigerpes, is a species of mantis in the family Hymenopodidae.

== See also ==
- List of mantis genera and species
