= Chrysomantis congica =

Scientific classification
- Kingdom: Animalia
- Phylum: Arthropoda
- Clade: Pancrustacea
- Class: Insecta
- Order: Mantodea
- Family: Hymenopodidae
- Genus: Chrysomantis
- Species: C. congica

Binomial name
- Chrysomantis congica La Greca & Lombardo, 1987

Species of praying mantis

Chrysomantis congica is a species of praying mantis endemic to the Congo River region.

== See also ==
- List of mantis genera and species
