= Anaxarcha limbata =

Scientific classification
- Kingdom: Animalia
- Phylum: Arthropoda
- Clade: Pancrustacea
- Class: Insecta
- Order: Mantodea
- Family: Hymenopodidae
- Genus: Anaxarcha
- Species: A. limbata

Binomial name
- Anaxarcha limbata Giglio-Tos, 1915

Synonyms
- Anaxarcha parallela Werner, 1930

Species of praying mantis

Anaxarcha limbata is a species of praying mantis found in India, Sumatra, and Borneo.

== See also ==
- List of mantis genera and species
