= Oxypiloidea congica =

Scientific classification
- Kingdom: Animalia
- Phylum: Arthropoda
- Clade: Pancrustacea
- Class: Insecta
- Order: Mantodea
- Family: Hymenopodidae
- Genus: Oxypiloidea
- Species: O. congica

Binomial name
- Oxypiloidea congica (Giglio-Tos, 1915)

Synonyms
- Catasigerpes congicus (Giglio-Tos, 1915)

Species of praying mantis

Oxypiloidea congica is a species of praying mantis in the family Hymenopodidae. It is native to central Africa.

== See also ==
- List of mantis genera and species
