= Astyliasula javana =

Scientific classification
- Domain: Eukaryota
- Kingdom: Animalia
- Phylum: Arthropoda
- Class: Insecta
- Order: Mantodea
- Family: Hymenopodidae
- Genus: Astyliasula
- Species: A. javana

Binomial name
- Astyliasula javana (Beier, 1929)

Synonyms
- Hestiasula javana Beier, 1929

Species of praying mantis

Astyliasula javana is a species of praying mantis in the family Hymenopodidae.

== See also ==
- List of mantis genera and species
