= Oxypiloidea zernyi =

Scientific classification
- Domain: Eukaryota
- Kingdom: Animalia
- Phylum: Arthropoda
- Class: Insecta
- Order: Mantodea
- Family: Hymenopodidae
- Genus: Oxypiloidea
- Species: O. zernyi

Binomial name
- Oxypiloidea zernyi (Beier, 1942)

Synonyms
- Catasigerpes zernyi Beier, 1942

Species of praying mantis

Oxypiloidea zernyi is a species of praying mantis in the family Hymenopodidae.

== See also ==
- List of mantis genera and species
