= Oxypiloidea granulata =

Scientific classification
- Kingdom: Animalia
- Phylum: Arthropoda
- Clade: Pancrustacea
- Class: Insecta
- Order: Mantodea
- Family: Hymenopodidae
- Genus: Oxypiloidea
- Species: O. granulata

Binomial name
- Oxypiloidea granulata (Roy, 1965)

Synonyms
- Catasigerpes granulatus Roy, 1965

Species of praying mantis

Oxypiloidea granulata is a species of praying mantis in the family Hymenopodidae.

== See also ==
- List of mantis genera and species
