= Catestiasula seminigra =

Scientific classification
- Kingdom: Animalia
- Phylum: Arthropoda
- Class: Insecta
- Order: Mantodea
- Family: Hymenopodidae
- Genus: Catestiasula
- Species: C. seminigra

Binomial name
- Catestiasula seminigra Zhang, 1992

Synonyms
- Hestiasula seminigra (Zhang, 1992)

Species of praying mantis

Catestiasula seminigra is a species of praying mantis in the family Hymenopodidae.

== See also ==
- List of mantis genera and species
