= Chrysomantis speciosa =

Scientific classification
- Kingdom: Animalia
- Phylum: Arthropoda
- Clade: Pancrustacea
- Class: Insecta
- Order: Mantodea
- Family: Hymenopodidae
- Genus: Chrysomantis
- Species: C. speciosa

Binomial name
- Chrysomantis speciosa Giglio-Tos, 1915

Synonyms
- Chrysomantis centralis La Greca & Lombardo, 1987; Chrysomantis cervoides La Greca & Lombardo, 1987

Species of praying mantis

Chrysomantis speciosa is a species of praying mantis found in West Africa (Côte d'Ivoire, Ghana), Angola, and the Congo River region.

== See also ==
- List of mantis genera and species
