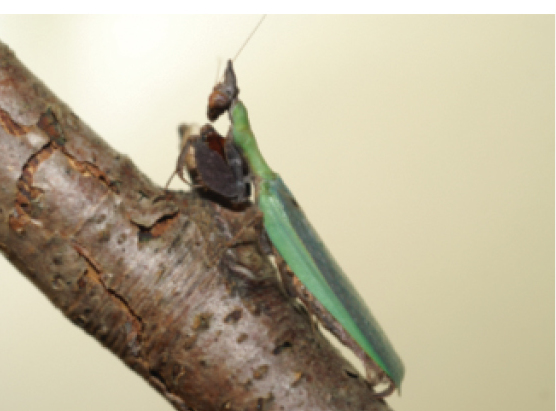
- Anasigerpes bifasciata (female)

Scientific classification
- Kingdom: Animalia
- Phylum: Arthropoda
- Clade: Pancrustacea
- Class: Insecta
- Order: Mantodea
- Family: Hymenopodidae
- Tribe: Otomantini
- Genus: Anasigerpes; Giglio-Tos, 1915

Species
- Anasigerpes amieti; Anasigerpes bifasciata; Anasigerpes centralis; Anasigerpes grilloti; Anasigerpes heydeni; Anasigerpes nigripes; Anasigerpes trifasciata; Anasigerpes unifasciata

Synonyms
- Phylloharpax Werner, 1915

= Anasigerpes =

Genus of praying mantises

Anasigerpes is a genus of praying mantis in the family Acromantinae from Africa.

== See also ==
- List of mantis genera and species
