= Junodia congica =

Scientific classification
- Kingdom: Animalia
- Phylum: Arthropoda
- Clade: Pancrustacea
- Class: Insecta
- Order: Mantodea
- Family: Hymenopodidae
- Genus: Junodia
- Species: J. congica

Binomial name
- Junodia congica Giglio-Tos, 1915

Synonyms
- Junodia maculata Roy, 1972

Species of praying mantis

Junodia congica is a species of mantis found in the Congo River region. It was first described in 1915 by Ermanno Giglio-Tos.
