= Anasigerpes nigripes =

Scientific classification
- Kingdom: Animalia
- Phylum: Arthropoda
- Clade: Pancrustacea
- Class: Insecta
- Order: Mantodea
- Family: Hymenopodidae
- Genus: Anasigerpes
- Species: A. nigripes

Binomial name
- Anasigerpes nigripes Roy, 1964

Synonyms
- Anasigerpes coxalis Werner, 1915; Anasigerpes punctata Roy, 1966

Species of praying mantis

Anasigerpes nigripes, the black-footed anasigerpes, is a species of mantis in the family Hymenopodidae. It is found in western and central Africa (Ivory Coast, Ghana, and Democratic Republic of the Congo).

== See also ==
- List of mantis genera and species
