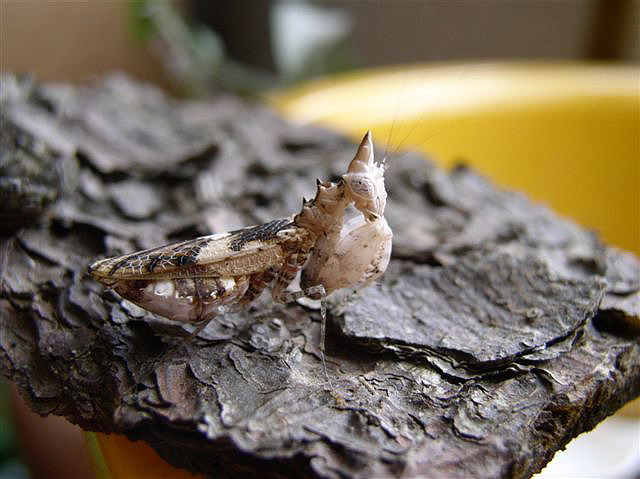
- Ceratomantis saussurii

Scientific classification
- Kingdom: Animalia
- Phylum: Arthropoda
- Clade: Pancrustacea
- Class: Insecta
- Order: Mantodea
- Family: Hymenopodidae
- Genus: Ceratomantis
- Species: C. saussurii

Binomial name
- Ceratomantis saussurii Wood-Mason, 1876

= Ceratomantis saussurii =

Species of praying mantis

Ceratomantis saussurii, Sausuri's ceratomantis, is a species of mantis native to Myanmar, Thailand, and Borneo.

== See also ==
- List of mantis genera and species
