= Chrysomantis tessmanni =

Scientific classification
- Domain: Eukaryota
- Kingdom: Animalia
- Phylum: Arthropoda
- Class: Insecta
- Order: Mantodea
- Family: Hymenopodidae
- Genus: Chrysomantis
- Species: C. tessmanni

Binomial name
- Chrysomantis tessmanni Werner, 1928

Synonyms
- Anoplosigerpes tessmanni Beier, 1933; Chrysomantis tristis Beier, 1930

Species of praying mantis

Chrysomantis tessmanni is a species of praying mantis.

== See also ==
- List of mantis genera and species
