= Ceratomantis yunnanensis =

Scientific classification
- Kingdom: Animalia
- Phylum: Arthropoda
- Clade: Pancrustacea
- Class: Insecta
- Order: Mantodea
- Family: Hymenopodidae
- Genus: Ceratomantis
- Species: C. yunnanensis

Binomial name
- Ceratomantis yunnanensis Zhang, 1986

Species of praying mantis

Ceratomantis yunnanensis, the Yunnan ceratomantis, is a species of mantis native to China that was undiscovered until 1986.

== See also ==
- List of mantis genera and species
