= Chrysomantis girardi =

Scientific classification
- Kingdom: Animalia
- Phylum: Arthropoda
- Clade: Pancrustacea
- Class: Insecta
- Order: Mantodea
- Family: Hymenopodidae
- Genus: Chrysomantis
- Species: C. girardi

Binomial name
- Chrysomantis girardi Gillon & Roy, 1968

Species of praying mantis

Chrysomantis girardi is a species of praying mantis found in Côte d'Ivoire and Guinea.

== See also ==
- List of mantis genera and species
