= Catestiasula nitida =

Scientific classification
- Kingdom: Animalia
- Phylum: Arthropoda
- Clade: Pancrustacea
- Class: Insecta
- Order: Mantodea
- Family: Hymenopodidae
- Genus: Catestiasula
- Species: C. nitida

Binomial name
- Catestiasula nitida (Brunner, 1893)

Synonyms
- Hestiasula nitida Brunner, 1893

Species of praying mantis

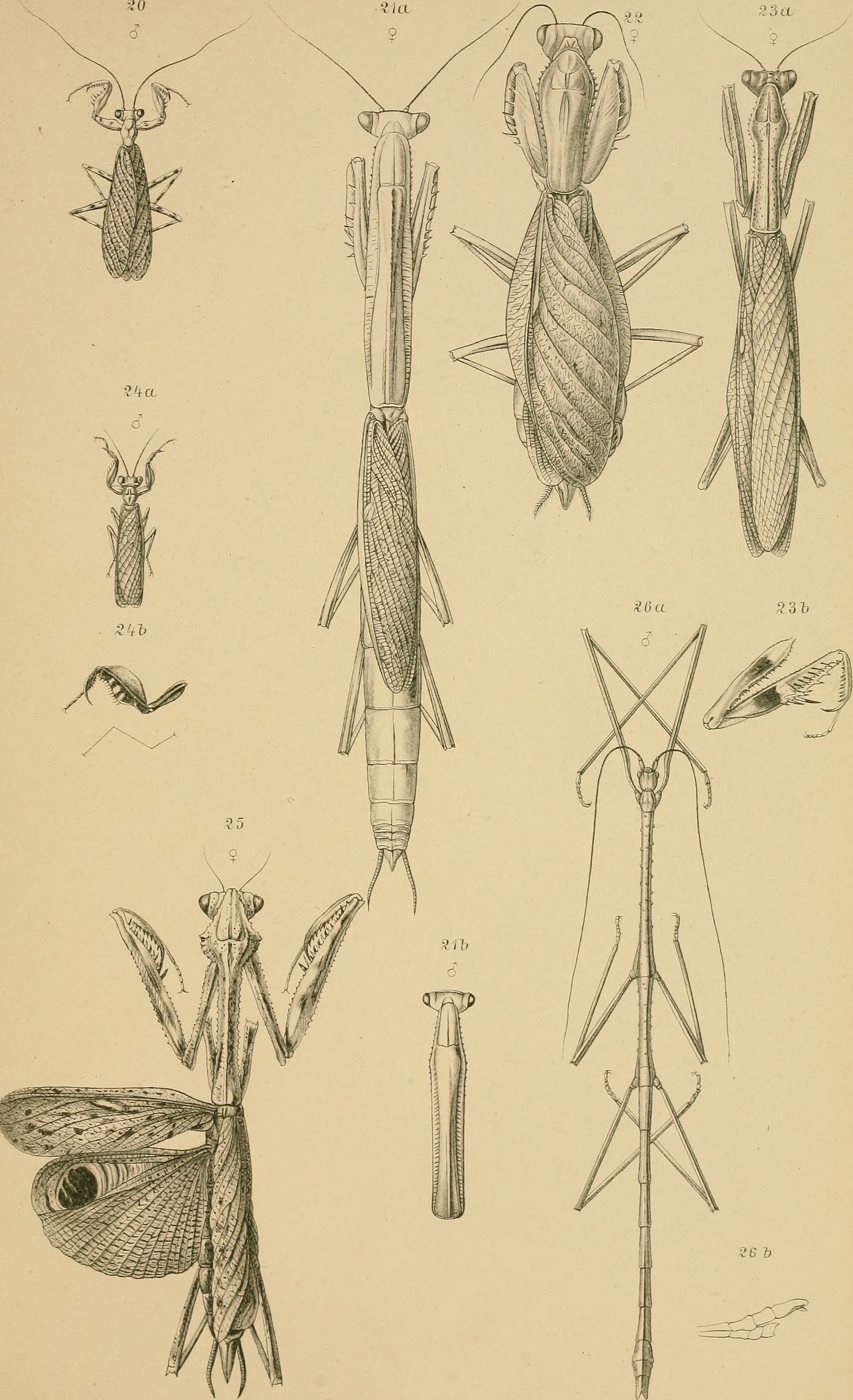

Catestiasula nitida is a species of praying mantis in the family Hymenopodidae.

== See also ==
- List of mantis genera and species
