= Hestiasula ceylonica =

Scientific classification
- Domain: Eukaryota
- Kingdom: Animalia
- Phylum: Arthropoda
- Class: Insecta
- Order: Mantodea
- Family: Hymenopodidae
- Genus: Hestiasula
- Species: H. ceylonica

Binomial name
- Hestiasula ceylonica Beier, 1956

Species of praying mantis

Hestiasula ceylonica is a species of praying mantis in the family Hymenopodidae.

== See also ==
- List of mantis genera and species
