= Anasigerpes unifasciata =

Scientific classification
- Kingdom: Animalia
- Phylum: Arthropoda
- Clade: Pancrustacea
- Class: Insecta
- Order: Mantodea
- Family: Hymenopodidae
- Genus: Anasigerpes
- Species: A. unifasciata

Binomial name
- Anasigerpes unifasciata Roy, 1979

Species of praying mantis

Anasigerpes unifasciata is a species of praying mantis in the family Hymenopodidae. It is found in West Africa (Ivory Coast, Ghana, and Guinea).

== See also ==
- List of mantis genera and species
