= Junodia =

Scientific classification
- Kingdom: Animalia
- Phylum: Arthropoda
- Clade: Pancrustacea
- Class: Insecta
- Order: Mantodea
- Family: Hymenopodidae
- Tribe: Oxypilini
- Genus: Junodia; Schulthess-Rechberg, 1899

Species
- See text

Synonyms
- Euoxypilus Giglio-Tos, 1915

Genus of praying mantises

Junodia is a genus of praying mantises native to Africa and represented by the following species:

- Junodia amoena
- Junodia beieri
- Junodia congica
- Junodia hararensis
- Junodia lameyi
- Junodia maternaschulzei
- Junodia spinosa
- Junodia stiewei
- Junodia strigipennis
- Junodia vansomereni
- Junodia vansoni

== See also ==
- List of mantis genera and species
