= Assinia pulchra =

Scientific classification
- Kingdom: Animalia
- Phylum: Arthropoda
- Class: Insecta
- Order: Coleoptera
- Suborder: Polyphaga
- Infraorder: Cucujiformia
- Family: Cerambycidae
- Genus: Assinia
- Species: A. pulchra

Binomial name
- Assinia pulchra Breuning, 1940

Species of beetle

Assinia pulchra is a species of beetle in the family Cerambycidae. It was described by Breuning in 1940.
