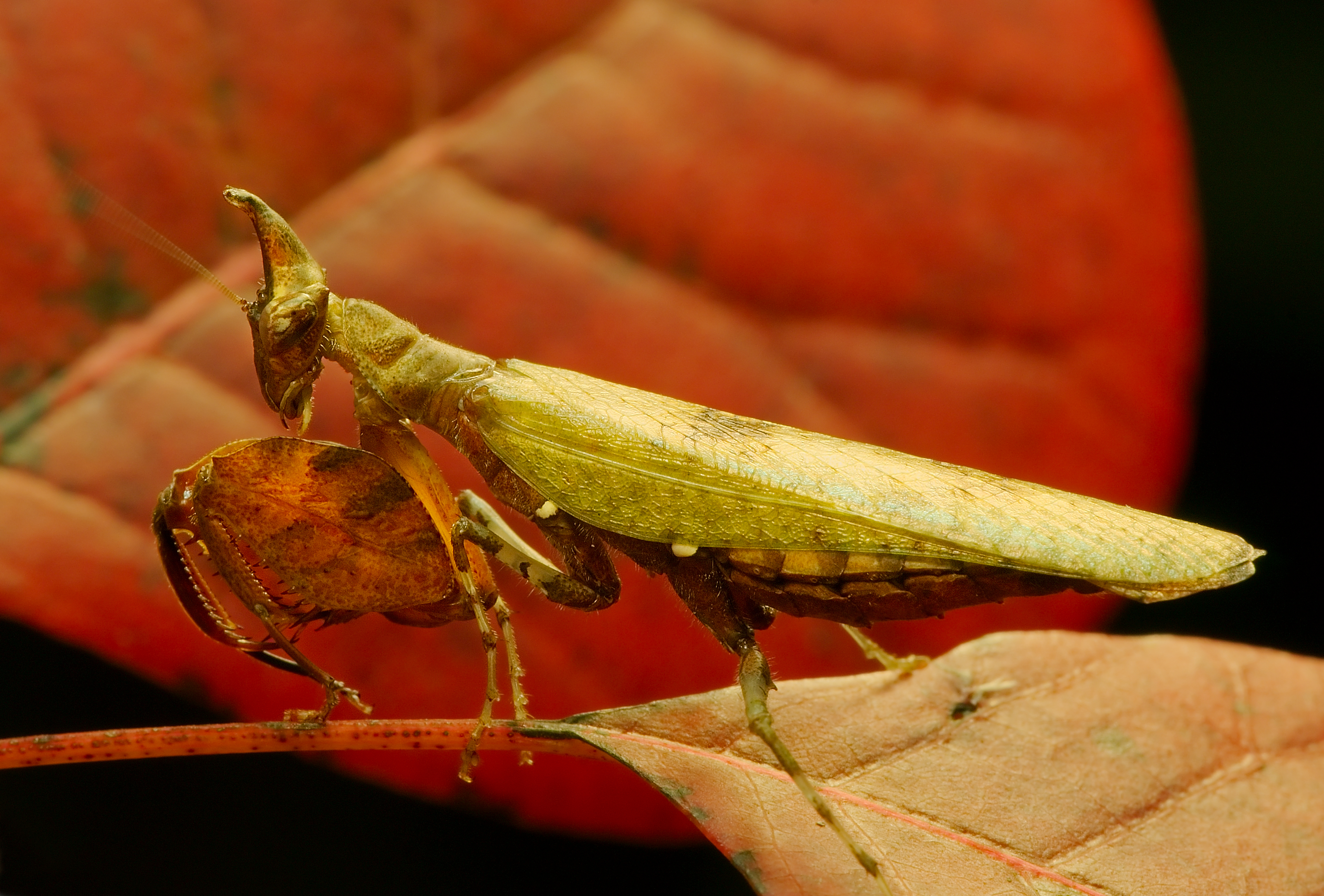
- Adult female Hestiasula brunneriana

Scientific classification
- Kingdom: Animalia
- Phylum: Arthropoda
- Clade: Pancrustacea
- Class: Insecta
- Order: Mantodea
- Family: Hymenopodidae
- Tribe: Hestiasulini
- Genus: Hestiasula; Saussure, 1871

Species
- See text

Synonyms
- Hestias Saussure, 1872

= Hestiasula =

Genus of praying mantises

Hestiasula is a genus of Asian praying mantids in the subfamily Oxypilinae of the family Hymenopodidae.

== Species ==
- Hestiasula brachyptera Villani, 2016
- Hestiasula brunneriana Saussure, 1871
- Hestiasula castetsi Bolivar, 1897
- Hestiasula ceylonica Beier, 1956
- Hestiasula gyldenstolpei Werner, 1930
- Hestiasula kastneri Beier, 1942
- Hestiasula masoni Giglio-Tos, 1915
- Hestiasula nigrofemorata Werner, 1930
- Hestiasula woodi Giglio-Tos, 1915
- Hestiasula zhejiangensis Zhou & Shen, 1992

== Additional images ==
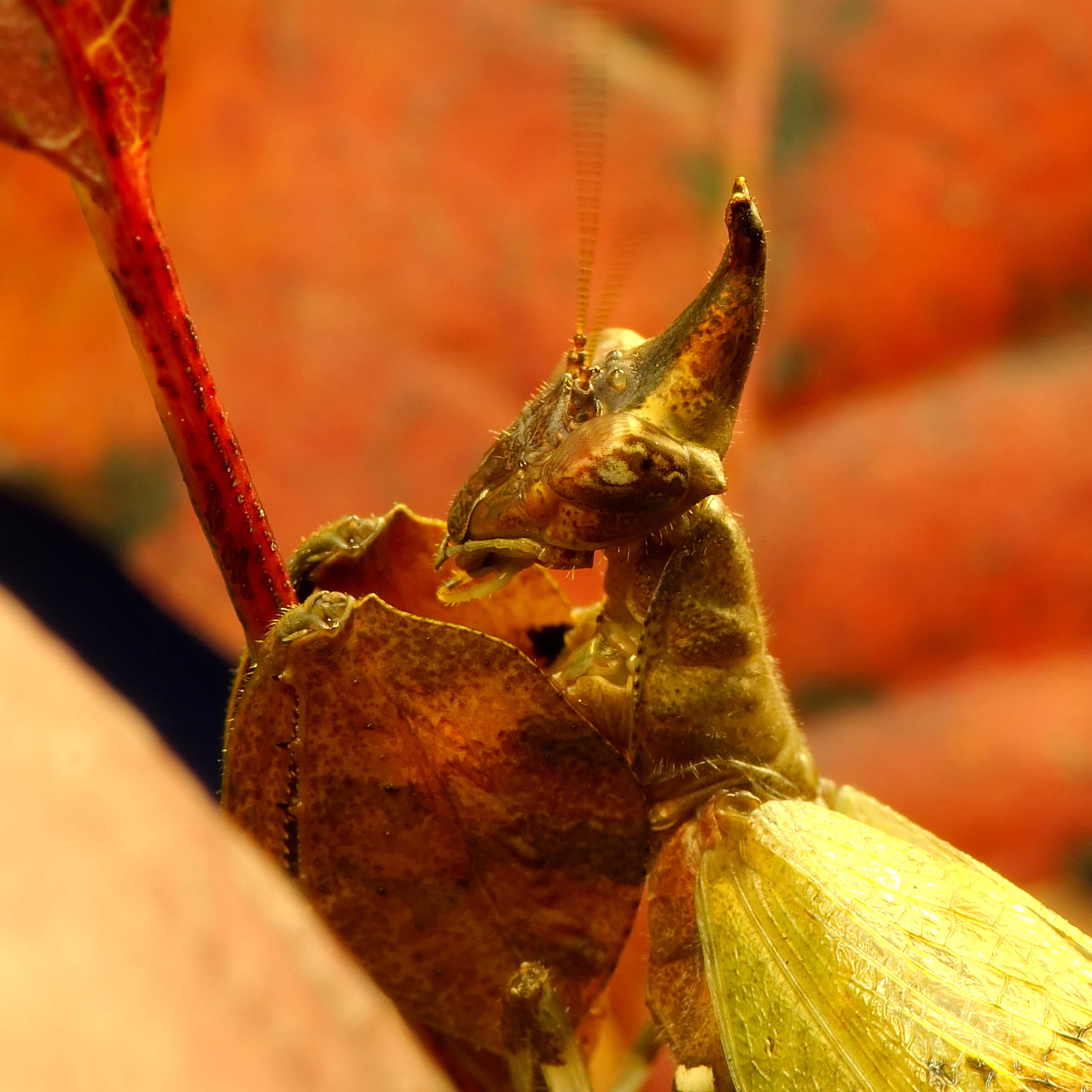
Adult female Hestiasula brunneriana head

== See also ==
- List of mantis genera and species
- Boxer mantis
