= Agrotis alluaudi =

Scientific classification
- Kingdom: Animalia
- Phylum: Arthropoda
- Clade: Pancrustacea
- Class: Insecta
- Order: Lepidoptera
- Superfamily: Noctuoidea
- Family: Noctuidae
- Genus: Agrotis
- Species: A. alluaudi

Binomial name
- Agrotis alluaudi Viette, 1958

Species of moth

Agrotis alluaudi is a moth of the family Noctuidae. It is found in Réunion. The male adults of this species have large, bipectinated antennaes.
