= Acromantis nicobarica =

Scientific classification
- Kingdom: Animalia
- Phylum: Arthropoda
- Clade: Pancrustacea
- Class: Insecta
- Order: Mantodea
- Family: Hymenopodidae
- Genus: Acromantis
- Species: A. nicobarica

Binomial name
- Acromantis nicobarica Mukherjee, 1995

Species of praying mantis

Acromantis nicobarica is a species of praying mantis native to the Nicobar Islands, a part of India near Myanmar.

== See also ==
- List of mantis genera and species
