= Acromantis montana =

Scientific classification
- Kingdom: Animalia
- Phylum: Arthropoda
- Clade: Pancrustacea
- Class: Insecta
- Order: Mantodea
- Family: Hymenopodidae
- Genus: Acromantis
- Species: A. montana

Binomial name
- Acromantis montana Giglio-Tos, 1915

Species of praying mantis

Acromantis montana, the mountain acromantis, is a species of praying mantis found in India, Java, and Borneo.

== See also ==
- List of mantis genera and species
