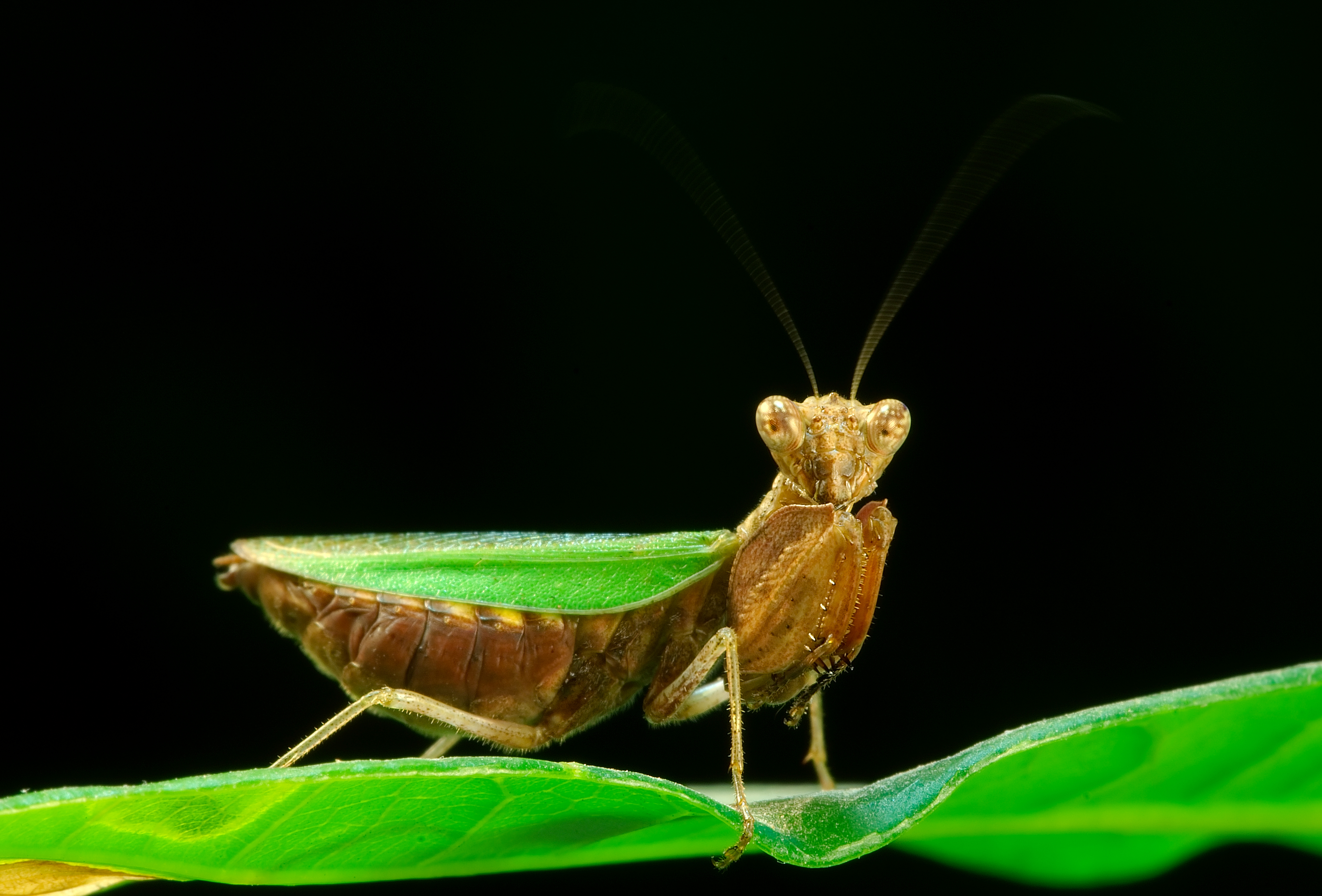
- Ephestiasula

Scientific classification
- Kingdom: Animalia
- Phylum: Arthropoda
- Clade: Pancrustacea
- Class: Insecta
- Order: Mantodea
- Family: Hymenopodidae
- Subfamily: Oxypilinae
- Tribe: Hestiasulini
- Genus: Ephestiasula; Giglio-Tos, 1915

= Ephestiasula =

Genus of praying mantises

Ephestiasula is a genus of praying mantises belonging to the family Hymenopodidae. The species of this genus are found in India.

Species:

- Ephestiasula obscura Lombardo, 1995
- Ephestiasula rogenhoferi (Saussure, 1872)
- Ephestiasula woodmasoni Mukherjee, Stiewe & Ghorai, 2010
