= Acromantis oligoneura =

Scientific classification
- Kingdom: Animalia
- Phylum: Arthropoda
- Clade: Pancrustacea
- Class: Insecta
- Order: Mantodea
- Family: Hymenopodidae
- Genus: Acromantis
- Species: A. oligoneura

Binomial name
- Acromantis oligoneura (Haan, 1842)

Synonyms
- Acromantis formosa (Saussure, 1870); Acromantis parvula (Westwood, 1889)

Species of praying mantis

Acromantis oligoneura, the few-netted acromantis, is a species of praying mantis the family Hymenopodidae described by Wilhelm de Haan in 1842. No subspecies are listed.

== See also ==
- List of mantis genera and species
