= Anaxarcha =

Scientific classification
- Kingdom: Animalia
- Phylum: Arthropoda
- Clade: Pancrustacea
- Class: Insecta
- Order: Mantodea
- Family: Hymenopodidae
- Tribe: Anaxarchini
- Genus: Anaxarcha; Stål, 1877

Synonyms
- Anaxandra Kirby, 1904 (Unavailable misspelling); Parastatilia Werner, 1922; Oxymantis Werner, 1931

Genus of praying mantises

Anaxarcha is a genus of Asian praying mantids, as the type genus for the Tribe Anaxarchini in the Family Hymenopodidae. They are widespread across southern China, but range into India, Myanmar, parts of Indo-China such as Vietnam, with a few Malaysian records in Sumatra and Borneo.

== Species ==
There are fourteen recognized species:(older in)

Complex Anaxarcha acuta

- Anaxarcha acuta
- Anaxarcha caiwenae
- Anaxarcha multipunctata
- Anaxarcha zhuyuae

Complex Anaxarcha graminea

- Anaxarcha graminea
- Anaxarcha intermedia
- Anaxarcha limbata
- Anaxarcha pulchella
- Anaxarcha pulchra
- Anaxarcha punctillata
- Anaxarcha robusta
- Anaxarcha sinensis
- Anaxarcha tianmushanensis
- Anaxarcha unicolor

Note: Anaxarcha tianmushanensis Zheng, 1985 has junior synonyms of Anaxarcha atrispina Yang 1999 per Wu & Chun-Xiang, 2023: 25, and Anaxarcha hyalina Zhang 1988: 105 per Liu & Wang in Yi et al. 2014: 250 (see also Wu & Chun-Xiang, 2023: 25), and

Else Anaxarcha maculata Mao & Yang 2002 and Anaxarcha zhengi Ren & Wang, 1994 are treated under Odontomantis
