= Oxypiloidea =

Scientific classification
- Kingdom: Animalia
- Phylum: Arthropoda
- Clade: Pancrustacea
- Class: Insecta
- Order: Mantodea
- Family: Hymenopodidae
- Tribe: Otomantini
- Genus: Oxypiloidea; Schulthess, 1898

Type species
- Sigerpes occidentalis Wood-Mason, 1879

Genus of praying mantises

Oxypiloidea is a genus of praying mantis in the family Hymenopodidae. 25 species are accepted within two subgenera:

- Subgenus Catasigerpes
  - Oxypiloidea camerunensis Giglio-Tos, 1915
  - Oxypiloidea centrafricana Roy, 2013
  - Oxypiloidea congica Giglio-Tos, 1915
  - Oxypiloidea granulata Roy, 1965
  - Oxypiloidea ivoirensis Roy, 2013
  - Oxypiloidea maldesi Roy, 2013
  - Oxypiloidea margarethae Werner, 1912
  - Oxypiloidea maroccana Roy, 2013
  - Oxypiloidea occidentalis Wood-Mason, 1879
  - Oxypiloidea orientalis Roy, 2013
  - Oxypiloidea sinuata Roy, 2013
- Subgenus Oxypiloidea
  - Oxypiloidea acuminata Kevan, 1954
  - Oxypiloidea angolica Roy, 2013
  - Oxypiloidea brunneriana Saussure, 1871
  - Oxypiloidea carvalhoi Roy, 2013
  - Oxypiloidea dargei Roy, 2013
  - Oxypiloidea denticulata Roy, 2013
  - Oxypiloidea jeanneli Chopard, 1938
  - Oxypiloidea lobata Schulthess-Schindler, 1898
  - Oxypiloidea mortuifolia Saussure, 1899
  - Oxypiloidea murphyi Roy, 2013
  - Oxypiloidea namibiana Roy, 2013
  - Oxypiloidea nigerica Giglio-Tos, 1915
  - Oxypiloidea tridens Saussure, 1872
  - Oxypiloidea zernyi (Beier, 1942)

== See also ==
- List of mantis genera and species
