= Chrysomantis =

Scientific classification
- Kingdom: Animalia
- Phylum: Arthropoda
- Clade: Pancrustacea
- Class: Insecta
- Order: Mantodea
- Family: Hymenopodidae
- Tribe: Otomantini
- Genus: Chrysomantis; Giglio-Tos, 1915

Synonyms
- Anoplosigerpes Werner, 1928; Uvarovmantis Beier, 1930

Genus of praying mantises

Chrysomantis is a genus of praying mantis in the family Hymenopodidae. They are native to Africa and are represented by the following species:

- Chrysomantis cachani
- Chrysomantis congica
- Chrysomantis girardi
- Chrysomantis royi
- Chrysomantis speciosa
- Chrysomantis tessmanni

== See also ==
- List of mantis genera and species
