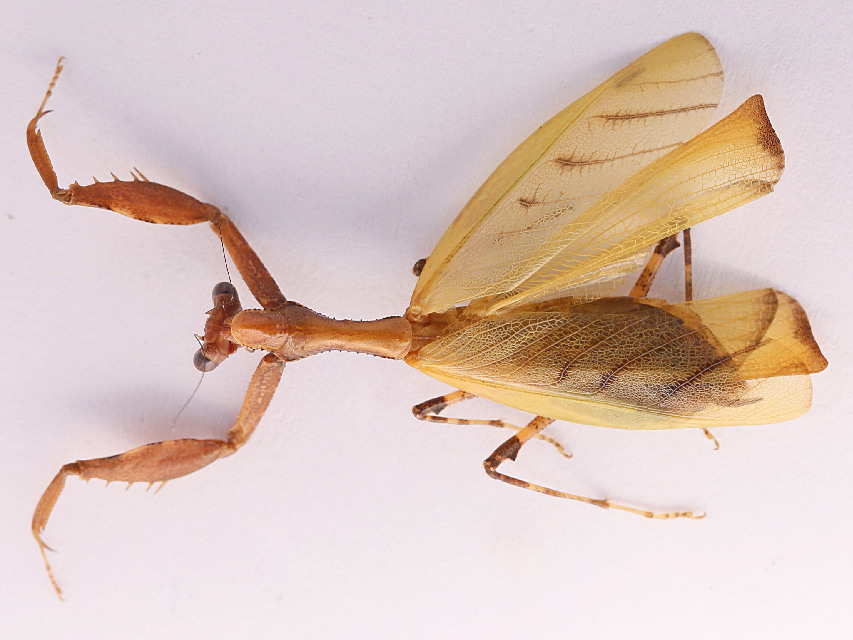

Scientific classification
- Kingdom: Animalia
- Phylum: Arthropoda
- Clade: Pancrustacea
- Class: Insecta
- Order: Mantodea
- Family: Hymenopodidae
- Genus: Acromantis
- Species: A. hesione

Binomial name
- Acromantis hesione Stål, 1877

= Acromantis hesione =

Species of praying mantis

Acromantis hesione, the Burmese mantis, is a species of praying mantis found in China and the Philippines.

== See also ==
- List of mantis genera and species
