= Acromantis luzonica =

Scientific classification
- Kingdom: Animalia
- Phylum: Arthropoda
- Clade: Pancrustacea
- Class: Insecta
- Order: Mantodea
- Family: Hymenopodidae
- Genus: Acromantis
- Species: A. luzonica

Binomial name
- Acromantis luzonica Hebard, 1920

Species of praying mantis

Acromantis luzonica, the Luzon mantis, is a species of praying mantis found in the Philippines.

== See also ==
- List of mantis genera and species
