= Acromantis moultoni =

Scientific classification
- Kingdom: Animalia
- Phylum: Arthropoda
- Clade: Pancrustacea
- Class: Insecta
- Order: Mantodea
- Family: Hymenopodidae
- Genus: Acromantis
- Species: A. moultoni

Binomial name
- Acromantis moultoni Giglio-Tos, 1915

Synonyms
- Acromantis westwoodi Giglio-Tos, 1915

Species of praying mantis

Acromantis moultoni, the Borneo acromantis, is a species of praying mantis native to Borneo.

== See also ==
- List of mantis genera and species
