= Ephestiasula rogenhoferi =

Scientific classification
- Kingdom: Animalia
- Phylum: Arthropoda
- Class: Insecta
- Order: Mantodea
- Family: Hymenopodidae
- Genus: Ephestiasula
- Species: E. rogenhoferi

Binomial name
- Ephestiasula rogenhoferi (Saussure, 1872)

Synonyms
- Ephestiasula amoena Bolivar, 1897; Ephestiasula intermedia Werner, 1930; Ephestiasula pictipes Wood-Mason, 1879; Hestiasula rogenhoferi Saussure, 1872

Species of praying mantis

Ephestiasula rogenhoferi is a species of praying mantis in the family Hymenopodidae.

== See also ==
- List of mantis genera and species
