= Abacetus alluaudi =

Scientific classification
- Kingdom: Animalia
- Phylum: Arthropoda
- Class: Insecta
- Order: Coleoptera
- Suborder: Adephaga
- Family: Carabidae
- Genus: Abacetus
- Species: A. alluaudi

Binomial name
- Abacetus alluaudi Tschitscherine, 1899

Species of beetle

Abacetus alluaudi is a species of ground beetle in the subfamily Pterostichinae. It was described by Tschitscherine in 1899. A. alluaudi is found in Côte d'Ivoire, Africa. A. alluaudi is a shiny black beetle, with an unusual upper jaw (mandible) which is more likely found in Caelostomus species.

== Taxonomy and phylogeny ==
A. alluaudi is named after the French entomologist Charles A. Alluaud who first collected the species.

== Description ==
=== Colour and markings ===
A. alluaudi is a shiny black colour with iridescent wings. The line of the junction between the prothorax and the wings and the associated lateral edges, have a reddish tinge. The legs and mouth feelers are a dull yellow brown to red in colour. The antenna are a dark reddish-brown.

=== Head features ===
Upper jaw is very slightly arched, similar to Celostomus species. Head is of medium size and smooth with short frontal impressions. Rear of the beetles head strongly diverges from the base. Female beetles have convex and protruding eyes. A. alluaudi has long antennae extending from the shoulders with a large first segment, which is at least as long as the next two combined.

== Distribution and habitat ==
The species was originally collected by Charles A. Alluaud from Assinie, Côte d'Ivoire, Africa. No other locations are known.

Very little is known about the habitat of A. alluaud, however, based on the collection records, the species is predominately found in a tropical savanna climate (Aw). Tropical savannas comprises grassland with isolated trees and shrubs and are generally found between tropical rainforest and desert biomes.

Assinie (Ivory Coast)
