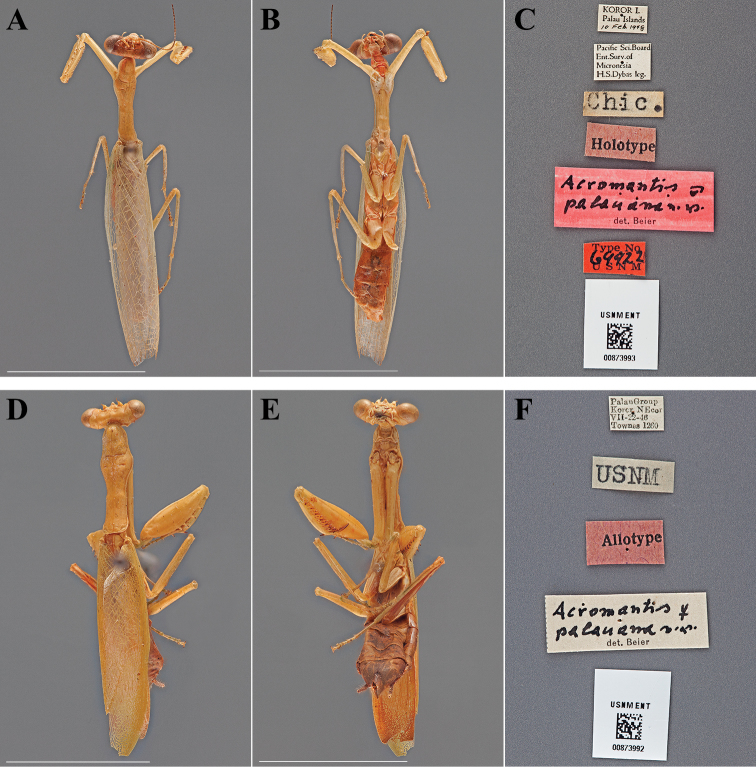

Scientific classification
- Kingdom: Animalia
- Phylum: Arthropoda
- Clade: Pancrustacea
- Class: Insecta
- Order: Mantodea
- Family: Hymenopodidae
- Genus: Acromantis
- Species: A. palauana

Binomial name
- Acromantis palauana Beier, 1972

= Acromantis palauana =

Species of praying mantis

Acromantis palauana, the Palau acromantis, is a species of praying mantis native to Palau.
