= Assinia alluaudi =

Scientific classification
- Kingdom: Animalia
- Phylum: Arthropoda
- Class: Insecta
- Order: Coleoptera
- Suborder: Polyphaga
- Infraorder: Cucujiformia
- Family: Cerambycidae
- Genus: Assinia
- Species: A. alluaudi

Binomial name
- Assinia alluaudi Lameere, 1893

Species of beetle

Assinia alluaudi is a species of beetle in the family Cerambycidae. It was described by Lameere in 1893.
