= Acromantis insularis =

Scientific classification
- Kingdom: Animalia
- Phylum: Arthropoda
- Clade: Pancrustacea
- Class: Insecta
- Order: Mantodea
- Family: Hymenopodidae
- Genus: Acromantis
- Species: A. insularis

Binomial name
- Acromantis insularis Giglio-Tos, 1915

Species of praying mantis

Acromantis insularis, common name Luzon mantis, is a species of praying mantis found in India, Sumatra, and Java.

== See also ==
- List of mantis genera and species
