= Anasigerpes heydeni =

Scientific classification
- Kingdom: Animalia
- Phylum: Arthropoda
- Clade: Pancrustacea
- Class: Insecta
- Order: Mantodea
- Family: Hymenopodidae
- Genus: Anasigerpes
- Species: A. heydeni

Binomial name
- Anasigerpes heydeni (Werner, 1908)

Synonyms
- Anasigerpes alluaudi Chopard, 1914; Anasigerpes crassipes Rehn, 1914; Anasigerpes modesta Giglio-Tos, 1915; Anasigerpes roemeri Werner, 1908

Species of praying mantis

Anasigerpes heydeni is a species of praying mantis in the family Hymenopodidae. It is found in West Africa (Ivory Coast, Gabon, Cameroon, Kenya, Congo, and the Central African Republic) and is the type species for the genus.

== See also ==
- List of mantis genera and species
