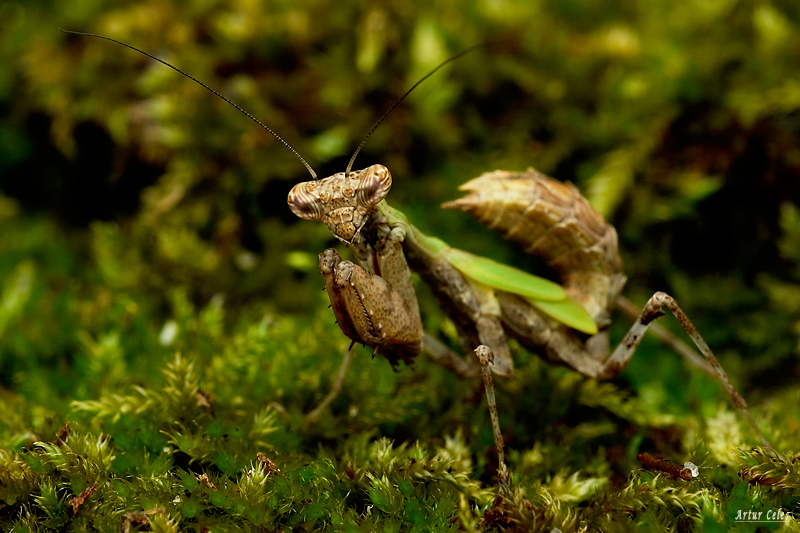
- Acromantis formosana

Scientific classification
- Kingdom: Animalia
- Phylum: Arthropoda
- Clade: Pancrustacea
- Class: Insecta
- Order: Mantodea
- Family: Hymenopodidae
- Genus: Acromantis
- Species: A. formosana

Binomial name
- Acromantis formosana Shiraki, 1911

= Acromantis formosana =

Species of praying mantis

Acromantis formosana, known as the Taiwan flower mantis, is a species of mantis native to Taiwan.

== Description ==
The female, as in other flower mantises is larger than the male. The nymph is mid to dark brown with flanged and spined extensions to its abdomen, disrupting its outline to provide excellent camouflage on dead leaves. The adult has a long narrow thorax and green wings. Females often reach around 3.5 cm in length, while males often reach about 3cm. Nymphs come in much smaller at around 6mm in length upon emerging from the ootheca.

== See also ==
- List of mantis genera and species
- Flower mantis
