= Acromantis dyaka =

Scientific classification
- Kingdom: Animalia
- Phylum: Arthropoda
- Clade: Pancrustacea
- Class: Insecta
- Order: Mantodea
- Family: Hymenopodidae
- Genus: Acromantis
- Species: A. dyaka

Binomial name
- Acromantis dyaka Hebard, 1920

Species of praying mantis

Acromantis dyaka is a species of praying mantis native to Borneo.

== See also ==
- List of mantis genera and species
