= Acromantis australis =

Scientific classification
- Kingdom: Animalia
- Phylum: Arthropoda
- Clade: Pancrustacea
- Class: Insecta
- Order: Mantodea
- Family: Hymenopodidae
- Genus: Acromantis
- Species: A. australis

Binomial name
- Acromantis australis Saussure, 1871

Species of praying mantis

Acromantis australis, the island mantis, is a species of praying mantis found in Australia, the Aru Islands, New Guinea, and Roon.

== See also ==
- List of mantis genera and species
