= Acromantis elegans =

Scientific classification
- Kingdom: Animalia
- Phylum: Arthropoda
- Clade: Pancrustacea
- Class: Insecta
- Order: Mantodea
- Family: Hymenopodidae
- Genus: Acromantis
- Species: A. elegans

Binomial name
- Acromantis elegans Lombardo, 1993

Species of praying mantis

Acromantis elegans, the elegant acromantis, is a species of praying mantis native to Nepal.

== See also ==
- List of mantis genera and species
