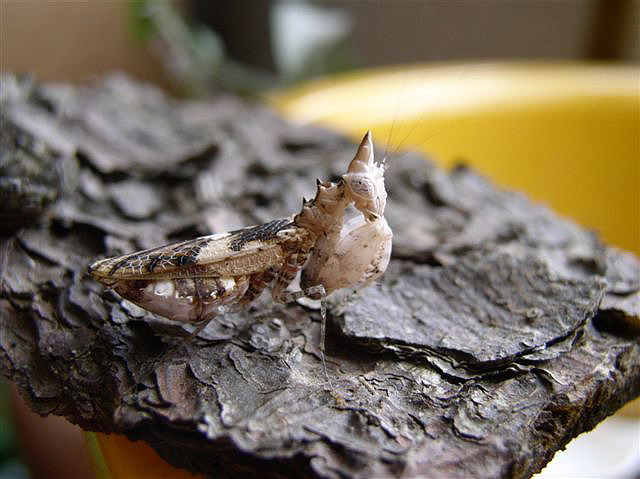
- Ceratomantis

Scientific classification
- Kingdom: Animalia
- Phylum: Arthropoda
- Clade: Pancrustacea
- Class: Insecta
- Order: Mantodea
- Family: Hymenopodidae
- Subfamily: Oxypilinae

Tribes
- Hestiasulini; Oxypilini

= Oxypilinae =

Subfamily of praying mantises

Oxypilinae is a subfamily of the mantis family Hymenopodidae.

== Tribes and genera ==
The Mantodea Species File lists:

=== Hestiasulini ===
Distribution: tropical Asia

- Astyliasula Schwarz & Shcherbakov, 2017
- Catestiasula Giglio-Tos, 1915
- Ephestiasula Giglio-Tos, 1915
- Hestiasula Saussure, 1871
- Pseudohestiasula Schwarz & Shcherbakov, 2017

=== Oxypilini ===
Distribution: Africa and tropical Asia

- Ceratomantis Wood-Mason, 1876
- Junodia Schulthess-Rechberg, 1899
- Oxypilus Serville, 1831
- Pachymantis Saussure, 1871
- Pseudoxypilus Giglio-Tos, 1915
