= Acromantis grandis =

Scientific classification
- Kingdom: Animalia
- Phylum: Arthropoda
- Clade: Pancrustacea
- Class: Insecta
- Order: Mantodea
- Family: Hymenopodidae
- Genus: Acromantis
- Species: A. grandis

Binomial name
- Acromantis grandis Giglio-Tos, 1915

Species of praying mantis

Acromantis grandis is a species of praying mantis found in Vietnam and Nepal.

== See also ==
- List of mantis genera and species
