= Ambivia =

Scientific classification
- Kingdom: Animalia
- Phylum: Arthropoda
- Clade: Pancrustacea
- Class: Insecta
- Order: Mantodea
- Family: Hymenopodidae
- Subfamily: Acromantinae
- Genus: Ambivia; Stål, 1877

Genus of praying mantises

Ambivia is a genus of praying mantids in the subfamily Acromantinae and the tribe Acromantini; species distribution records include Indo-China.

== Species ==
The Mantodea Species File lists:

- Ambivia parapopa Wang, 1993
- Ambivia popa Stal, 1877 (type species?)
