= Citharomantis =

Scientific classification
- Kingdom: Animalia
- Phylum: Arthropoda
- Clade: Pancrustacea
- Class: Insecta
- Order: Mantodea
- Family: Hymenopodidae
- Genus: Citharomantis; Rehn, 1909
- Species: C. falcata

Binomial name
- Citharomantis falcata Rehn, 1909

Genus of praying mantises

Citharomantis falcata is a species of praying mantis native to Sumatra and Borneo. It is the sole member of its genus and is related to the genus Acromantis (Saussure, 1870).

== See also ==
- List of mantis genera and species
