= Acromantis lilii =

Scientific classification
- Kingdom: Animalia
- Phylum: Arthropoda
- Clade: Pancrustacea
- Class: Insecta
- Order: Mantodea
- Family: Hymenopodidae
- Genus: Acromantis
- Species: A. lilii

Binomial name
- Acromantis lilii Werner, 1922

Synonyms
- Acromantis javana Giglio-Tos, 1915

Species of praying mantis

Acromantis lilii is a species of praying mantis native to Java and the Philippines.

== See also ==
- List of mantis genera and species
