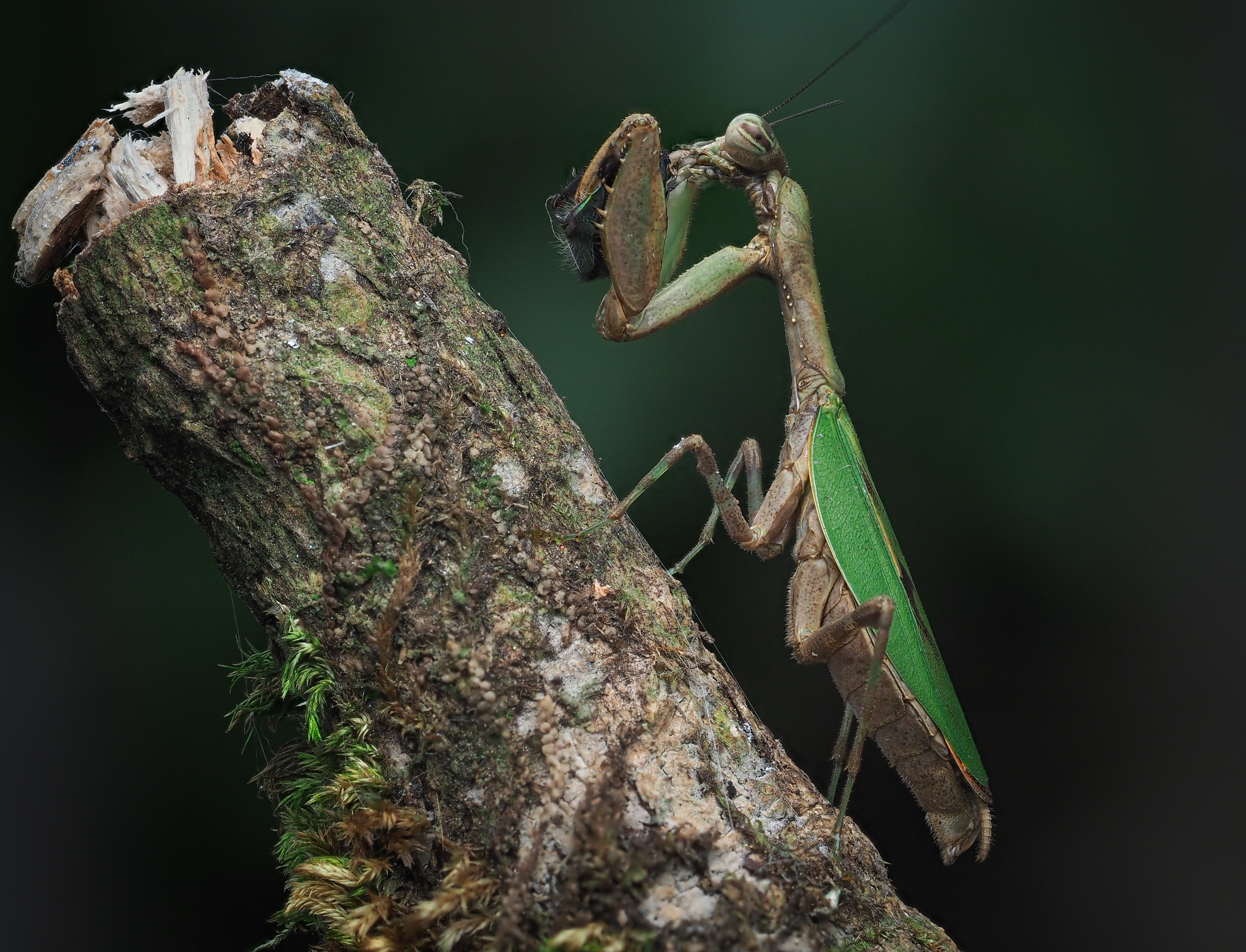

Scientific classification
- Kingdom: Animalia
- Phylum: Arthropoda
- Clade: Pancrustacea
- Class: Insecta
- Order: Mantodea
- Family: Hymenopodidae
- Genus: Acromantis
- Species: A. philippina

Binomial name
- Acromantis philippina Beier, 1966

= Acromantis philippina =

Species of praying mantis

Acromantis philippina, the Philippines acromantis, is a species of praying mantis native to the Philippines.

== See also ==
- List of mantis genera and species
