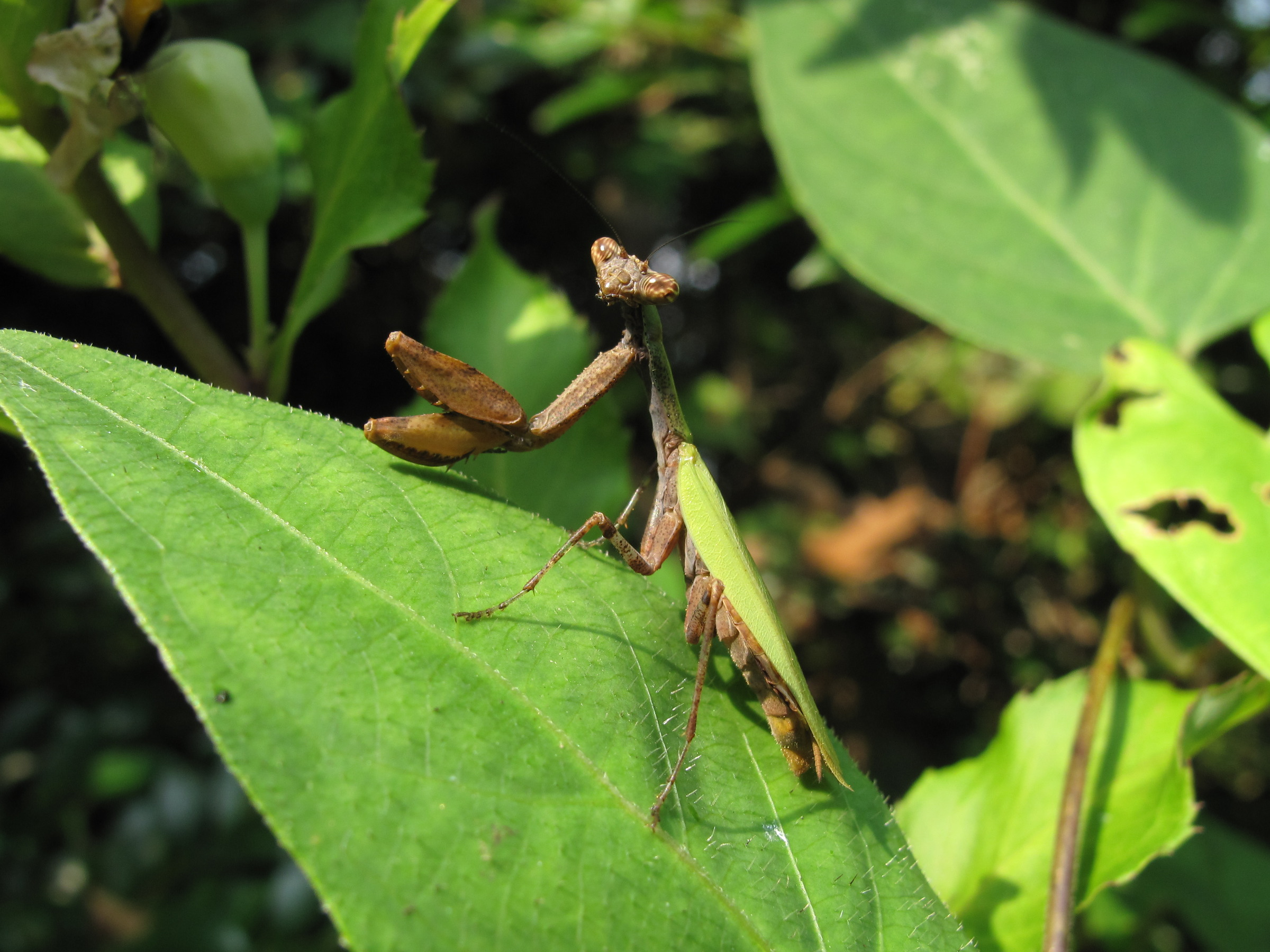
- Acromantis japonica

Scientific classification
- Kingdom: Animalia
- Phylum: Arthropoda
- Clade: Pancrustacea
- Class: Insecta
- Order: Mantodea
- Family: Hymenopodidae
- Subfamily: Acromantinae
- Genus: Acromantis; Saussure, 1870

Species
- See text

= Acromantis =

Genus of praying mantises

Acromantis is a genus of Asian praying mantids in the subfamily Acromantinae of the family Hymenopodidae.

== Species ==
The Mantodea Species File lists:

- Acromantis australis Saussure, 1871
- Acromantis dyaka Hebard, 1920
- Acromantis elegans Lombardo, 1993
- Acromantis formosana (Shiraki, 1911)
- Acromantis gestri Giglio-Tos, 1915
- Acromantis grandis Beier, 1930
- Acromantis hesione (Stål, 1877)
- Acromantis indica (Giglio-Tos, 1915)
- Acromantis insularis (Giglio-Tos, 1915)
- Acromantis japonica (Westwood, 1889)
- Acromantis lilii Werner, 1922
- Acromantis luzonica Hebard, 1920
- Acromantis montana Giglio-Tos, 1915
- Acromantis moultoni Giglio-Tos, 1915
- Acromantis nicobarica Mukherjee, 1995
- Acromantis oligoneura (de Haan, 1942) - type species
- Acromantis palauana Beier, 1972
- Acromantis philippina Beier, 1966
- Acromantis satsumensis (Matsumura, 1913)
- Acromantis siporana Giglio-Tos, 1915
