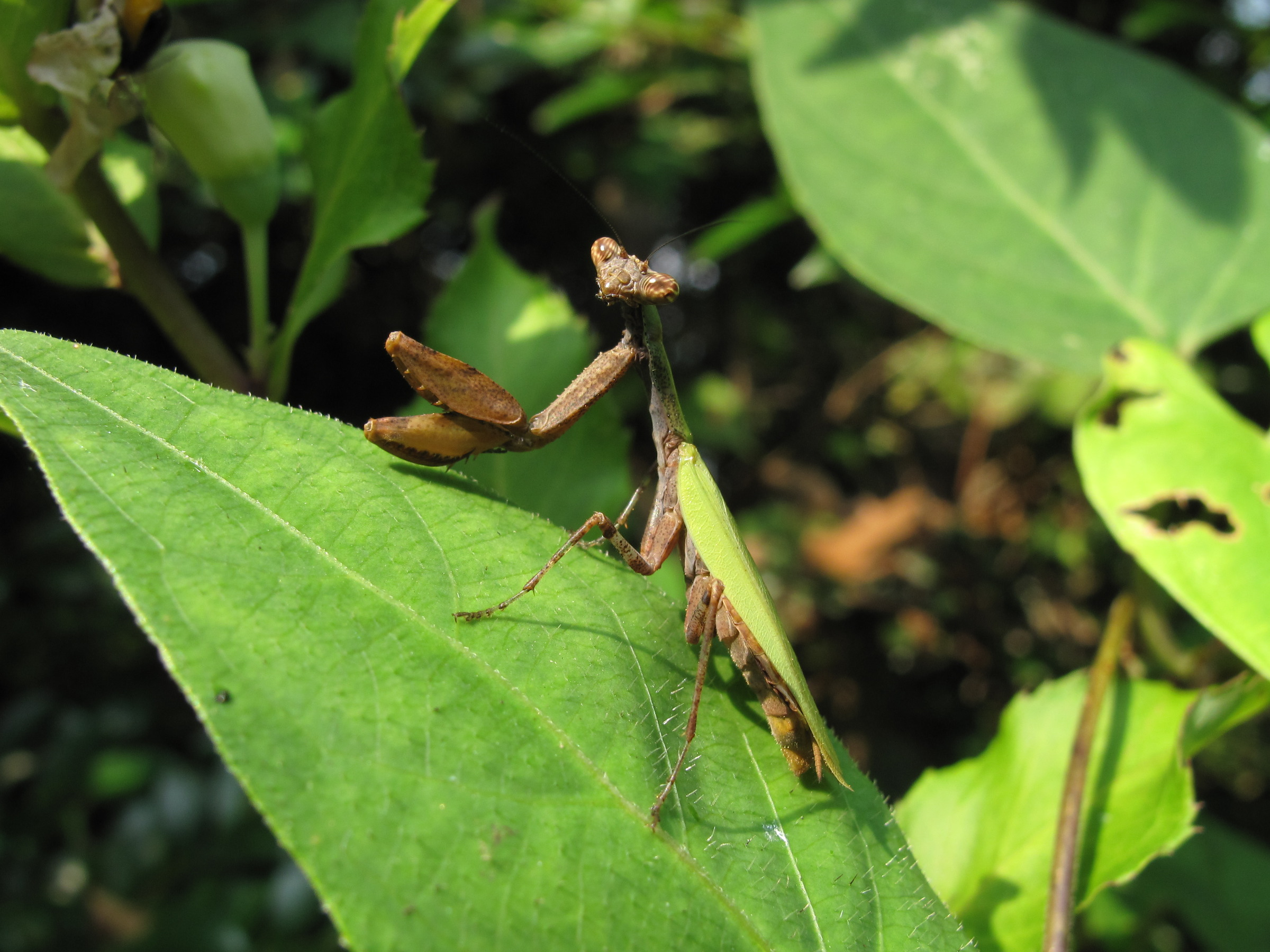

Scientific classification
- Kingdom: Animalia
- Phylum: Arthropoda
- Clade: Pancrustacea
- Class: Insecta
- Order: Mantodea
- Family: Hymenopodidae
- Genus: Acromantis
- Species: A. japonica

Binomial name
- Acromantis japonica Westwood, 1889

= Acromantis japonica =

Species of praying mantis

Acromantis japonica, the Japanese boxer mantis, is a species of praying mantis found in Japan, Korea, Taiwan, and China. It was described by John Obadiah Westwood in 1889. Acromantis japonica belongs to the family Hymenopodidae and subfamily Acromantinae. No subspecies are listed.

== See also ==
- List of mantis genera and species
