= Acromantis gestri =

Scientific classification
- Kingdom: Animalia
- Phylum: Arthropoda
- Clade: Pancrustacea
- Class: Insecta
- Order: Mantodea
- Family: Hymenopodidae
- Genus: Acromantis
- Species: A. gestri

Binomial name
- Acromantis gestri Giglio-Tos, 1915

Species of praying mantis

Acromantis gestri, the Sumatran acromantis or Thailand boxer praying mantis, is a species of praying mantis found in Malaysia and Sumatra.

== See also ==
- List of mantis genera and species
