= Tricondylomimus coomani =

Scientific classification
- Domain: Eukaryota
- Kingdom: Animalia
- Phylum: Arthropoda
- Class: Insecta
- Order: Mantodea
- Family: Gonypetidae
- Subfamily: Iridopteryginae
- Genus: Tricondylomimus
- Species: T. coomani

Binomial name
- Tricondylomimus coomani Chopard, 1930

Synonyms
- Nemotha coomani Beier, 1935

Species of praying mantis

Tricondylomimus coomani is the type species in its genus of praying mantids of the family Iridopterygidae.
