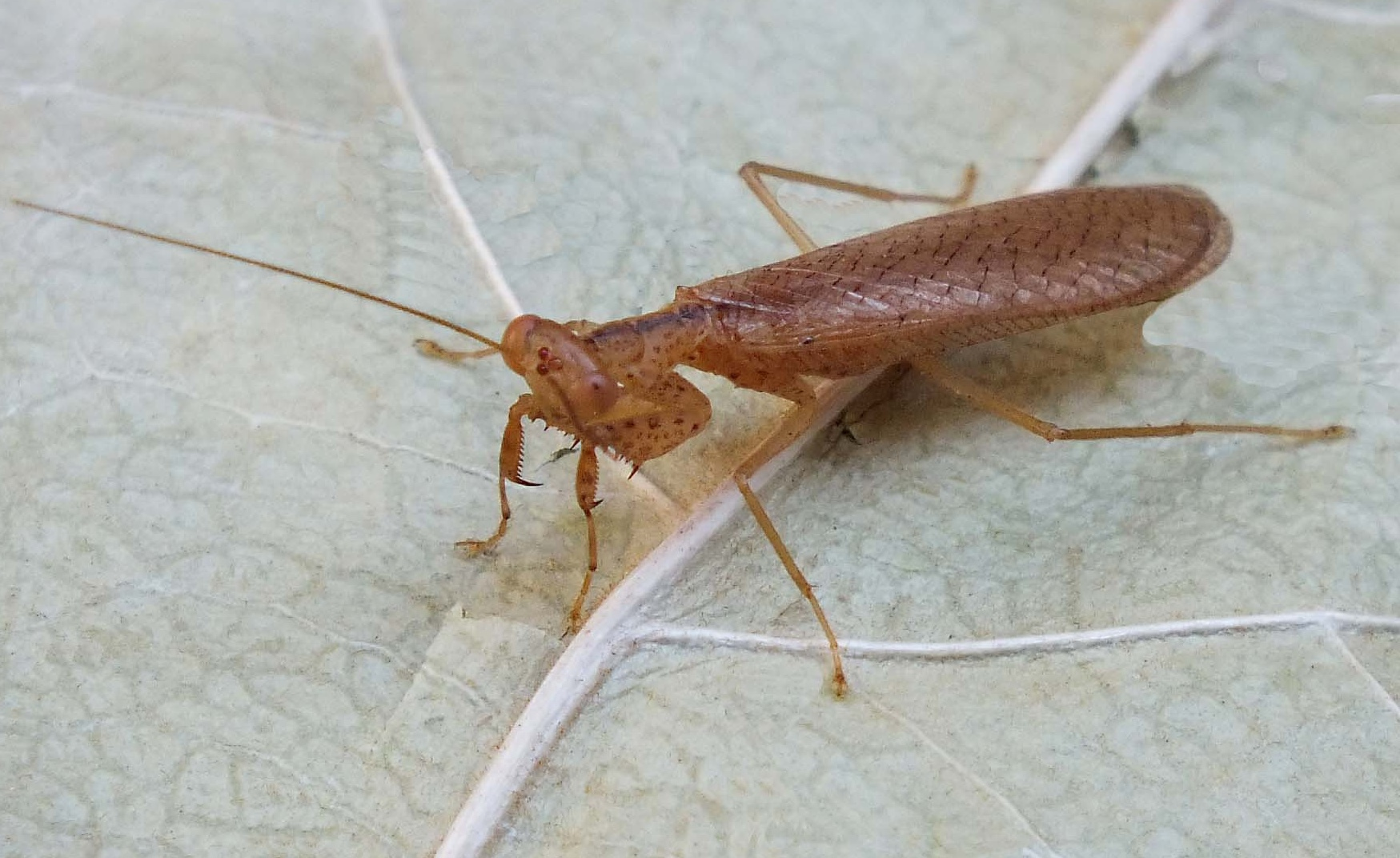
- Amantis reticulata

Scientific classification
- Kingdom: Animalia
- Phylum: Arthropoda
- Clade: Pancrustacea
- Class: Insecta
- Order: Mantodea
- Family: Gonypetidae
- Subfamily: Iridopteryginae
- Genus: Amantis
- Species: A. reticulata

Binomial name
- Amantis reticulata Haan, 1842

= Amantis reticulata =

Species of praying mantis

Amantis reticulata is a species of praying mantis in the family Mantidae, found in Indomalaya.
