= Compsomantis robusta =

Scientific classification
- Kingdom: Animalia
- Phylum: Arthropoda
- Class: Insecta
- Order: Mantodea
- Family: Gonypetidae
- Genus: Compsomantis
- Species: C. robusta

Binomial name
- Compsomantis robusta Werner, 1923

Species of praying mantis

Compsomantis robusta is a species of mantis found in Borneo.
