= Amantis vitalisi =

Scientific classification
- Kingdom: Animalia
- Phylum: Arthropoda
- Clade: Pancrustacea
- Class: Insecta
- Order: Mantodea
- Family: Gonypetidae
- Genus: Amantis
- Species: A. vitalisi

Binomial name
- Amantis vitalisi Werner, 1927

Synonyms
- Amantis maculata Shiraki, 1911

Species of praying mantis

Amantis vitalisi is a species of praying mantis native to Vietnam.
