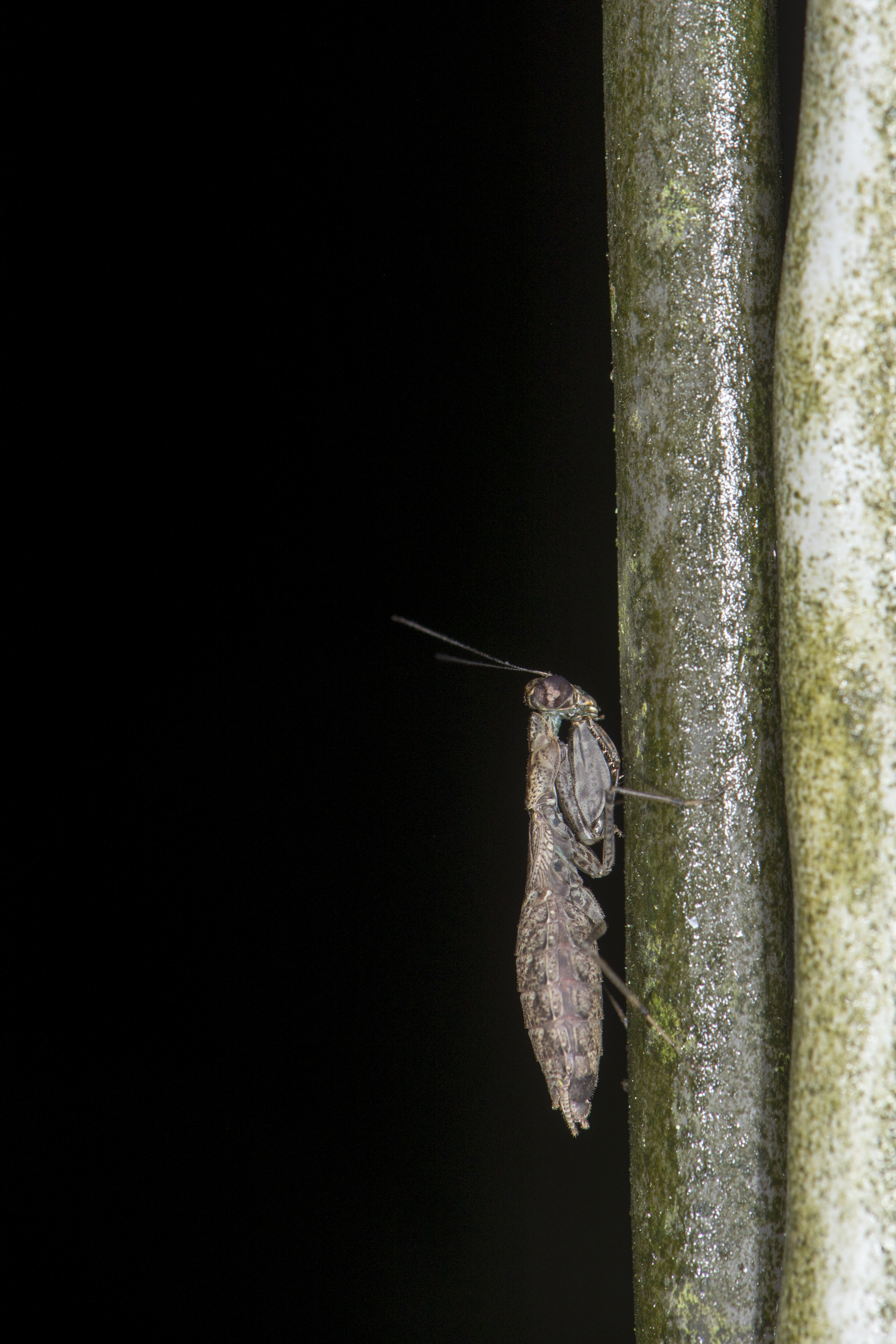

Scientific classification
- Kingdom: Animalia
- Phylum: Arthropoda
- Clade: Pancrustacea
- Class: Insecta
- Order: Mantodea
- Family: Gonypetidae
- Genus: Amantis
- Species: A. nawai

Binomial name
- Amantis nawai Shiraki, 1908

= Amantis nawai =

Species of praying mantis

Amantis nawai is a small species of praying mantis native to eastern Asia.

== Description ==
- Females: 15–20 millimetres (0.59–0.79 in), micropterous
- Males: 13–17 millimetres (0.51–0.67 in) in length, micropterous or macropterous

== Distribution ==
It is found in China, Sri Lanka, and Taiwan; in Japan on Honshu, Shikoku, Kyushu, and Okinawa, and South Korea.

== Habitat ==
They are found on the forest floor and low trees, where they eat insects such as ants. Often found around Machilus thunbergii and Castanopsis sieboldii, and other lush vegetation shaded by broadleaf evergreen trees and large rocks.

Oothecae are found on rocks and tree bark.
