= Compsomantis semirufula =

Scientific classification
- Kingdom: Animalia
- Phylum: Arthropoda
- Clade: Pancrustacea
- Class: Insecta
- Order: Mantodea
- Family: Gonypetidae
- Genus: Compsomantis
- Species: C. semirufula

Binomial name
- Compsomantis semirufula Werner, 1923

Species of praying mantis

Compsomantis semirufula is a species of mantis found in Malaysia, Sarawak, and the Sunda Islands.
