= Compsomantis ceylonica =

Scientific classification
- Kingdom: Animalia
- Phylum: Arthropoda
- Class: Insecta
- Order: Mantodea
- Family: Gonypetidae
- Genus: Compsomantis
- Species: C. ceylonica

Binomial name
- Compsomantis ceylonica Uvarov, 1927

Species of praying mantis

Compsomantis ceylonica is a species of mantis found in Sri Lanka.
