= A. fuliginosa =

A. fuliginosa may refer to:

- Amantis fuliginosa, a praying mantis species native to India
- Amphisbaena fuliginosa, the black and white amphisbaenian, a limbless lizard species
- Antennulariella fuliginosa, a fungus species in the genus Antennulariella

== See also ==
- Fuliginosa
