= Amantis basilana =

Scientific classification
- Kingdom: Animalia
- Phylum: Arthropoda
- Clade: Pancrustacea
- Class: Insecta
- Order: Mantodea
- Family: Gonypetidae
- Genus: Amantis
- Species: A. basilana

Binomial name
- Amantis basilana Hebard, 1920

Species of praying mantis

Amantis basilana is a species of praying mantis native to the Philippines.
