= Compsomantis tumidiceps =

Scientific classification
- Kingdom: Animalia
- Phylum: Arthropoda
- Clade: Pancrustacea
- Class: Insecta
- Order: Mantodea
- Family: Gonypetidae
- Genus: Compsomantis
- Species: C. tumidiceps

Binomial name
- Compsomantis tumidiceps Werner, 1923

Species of praying mantis

Compsomantis tumidiceps is a species of mantis found in Java, Lombok, the Philippines, Sumatra, Sumba, and Timor.
