= Compsomantis crassiceps =

Scientific classification
- Kingdom: Animalia
- Phylum: Arthropoda
- Clade: Pancrustacea
- Class: Insecta
- Order: Mantodea
- Family: Gonypetidae
- Genus: Compsomantis
- Species: C. crassiceps

Binomial name
- Compsomantis crassiceps de Haan, 1842

Species of praying mantis

Compsomantis crassiceps is a species of mantis found in Borneo and Java.
