= Amantis hainanensis =

Scientific classification
- Kingdom: Animalia
- Phylum: Arthropoda
- Clade: Pancrustacea
- Class: Insecta
- Order: Mantodea
- Family: Gonypetidae
- Genus: Amantis
- Species: A. hainanensis

Binomial name
- Amantis hainanensis Tinkham, 1937

Species of praying mantis

Amantis hainanensis is a species of praying mantis native to China and Vietnam.

It is a small mantid with short, filiform antennae, large grey eyes. It is light grey with black spots. The forelegs have rows of short spines.
