= Compsomantis mindoroensis =

Scientific classification
- Kingdom: Animalia
- Phylum: Arthropoda
- Class: Insecta
- Order: Mantodea
- Family: Gonypetidae
- Genus: Compsomantis
- Species: C. mindoroensis

Binomial name
- Compsomantis mindoroensis Beier, 1942

Species of praying mantis

Compsomantis mindoroensis is a species of mantis endemic to the Philippines.

== See also ==
- List of mantis genera and species
