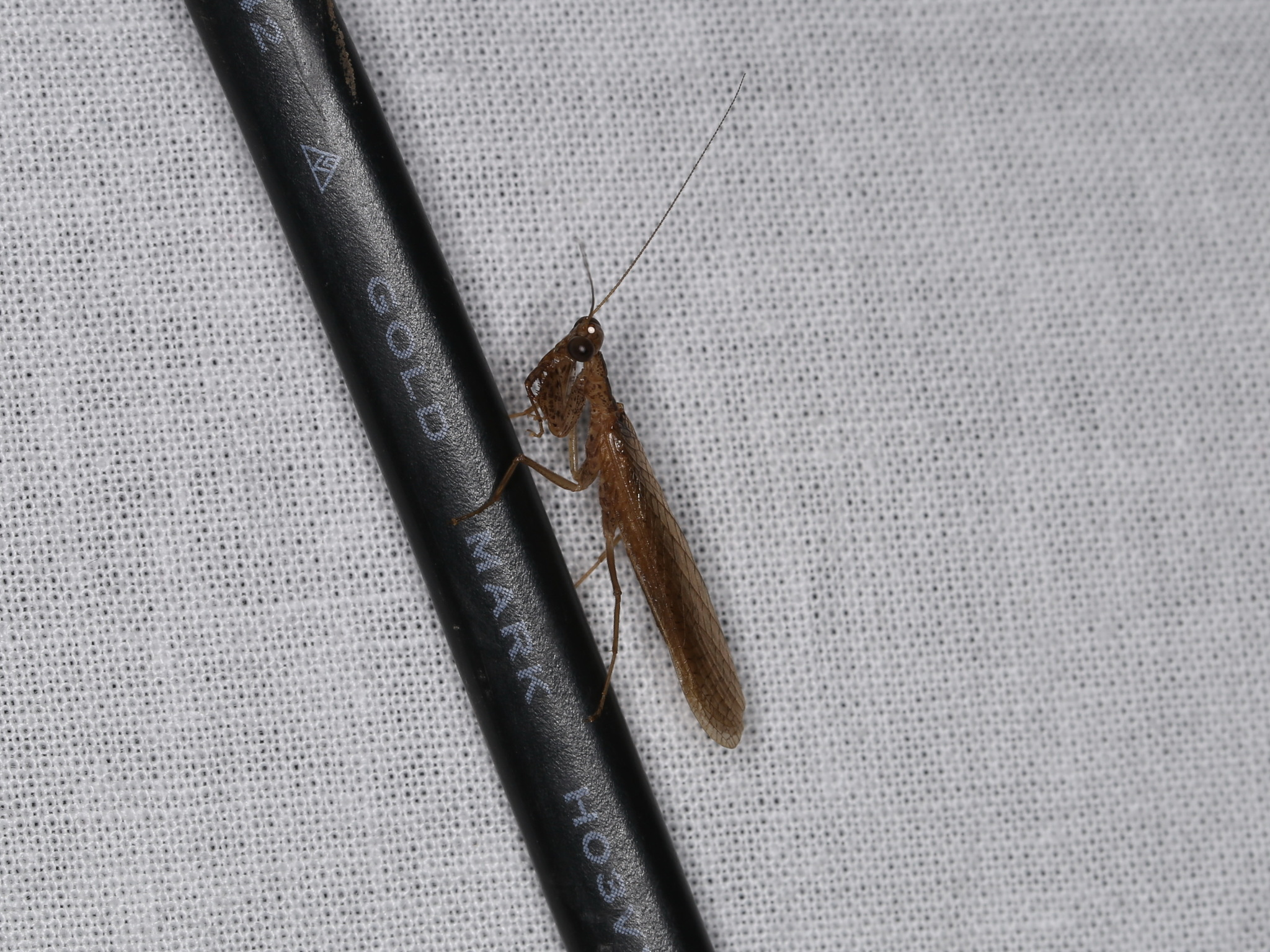

Scientific classification
- Kingdom: Animalia
- Phylum: Arthropoda
- Clade: Pancrustacea
- Class: Insecta
- Order: Mantodea
- Family: Gonypetidae
- Genus: Amantis
- Species: A. longipennis

Binomial name
- Amantis longipennis Beier, 1930

= Amantis longipennis =

Species of praying mantis

Amantis longipennis is a species of praying mantis native to Vietnam.
