= Gonypetyllis semuncialis =

Scientific classification
- Kingdom: Animalia
- Phylum: Arthropoda
- Class: Insecta
- Order: Mantodea
- Family: Gonypetidae
- Genus: Gonypetyllis
- Species: G. semuncialis

Binomial name
- Gonypetyllis semuncialis Wood-Mason, 1891

Species of praying mantis

Gonypetyllis semuncialis is one of the smallest species of praying mantis and "scarcely reach(es) one centimeter in length."

== See also ==
- List of mantis genera and species
