= Tricondylomimus =

Scientific classification
- Kingdom: Animalia
- Phylum: Arthropoda
- Clade: Pancrustacea
- Class: Insecta
- Order: Mantodea
- Family: Gonypetidae
- Subfamily: Iridopteryginae
- Genus: Tricondylomimus; Chopard, 1930

Synonyms
- Pseudogousa Tinkham, 1937

Genus of praying mantises

Tricondylomimus is an Asian genus of praying mantis in the family Gonypetidae. Formerly considered as a junior synonym of the genus Nemotha, Chopard's original genus name was restored in 2017. The name is for the similarity to tiger beetles in the genus Tricondyla contributed by the pronotal shape and color.

== Species ==
The Mantodea Species File lists:

- Tricondylomimus coomani Chopard, 1930 – type species (locality Vietnam)
- Tricondylomimus intermedius Stiewe & Shcherbakov, 2017
- Tricondylomimus mirabiliis Beier, 1935
