= Amantis indica =

Scientific classification
- Kingdom: Animalia
- Phylum: Arthropoda
- Clade: Pancrustacea
- Class: Insecta
- Order: Mantodea
- Family: Gonypetidae
- Genus: Amantis
- Species: A. indica

Binomial name
- Amantis indica Giglio-Tos, 1915

Species of praying mantis

Amantis indica is a species of praying mantis native to India.

== See also ==
- List of mantis genera and species
