= Amantis irina =

Scientific classification
- Kingdom: Animalia
- Phylum: Arthropoda
- Clade: Pancrustacea
- Class: Insecta
- Order: Mantodea
- Family: Gonypetidae
- Genus: Amantis
- Species: A. irina

Binomial name
- Amantis irina Saussure, 1870

Species of praying mantis

Amantis aliena is a species of praying mantis native to Amboina, Sumatra, Malaysia, Moluccas, and Myanmar.
