= Amantis malayana =

Scientific classification
- Kingdom: Animalia
- Phylum: Arthropoda
- Clade: Pancrustacea
- Class: Insecta
- Order: Mantodea
- Family: Gonypetidae
- Genus: Amantis
- Species: A. malayana

Binomial name
- Amantis malayana (Westwood, 1889)

Species of praying mantis

Amantis malayana (Westwood, 1889) is a species of praying mantis native to Indonesia, on the islands of Bacan, Kaisa, (Note: The place name "Kaisa" does not seem to appear in modern records. However, Alfred Russel Wallace visited the Kaisa Islands in about 1859. Westwood described this species as Gonypeta malayana, based on Wallace's specimens in 1889. Little is known about this insect, other than that it lives in terrestrial environments in Indonesia. "Kaisa" was alternatively spelled "Kaisaa", and has been identified as Kayoa, within the Bacan archipelago. A. malayana was reported from "Kaisa" in 1889.) and Sulawesi.
