= Amantis gestri =

Scientific classification
- Kingdom: Animalia
- Phylum: Arthropoda
- Clade: Pancrustacea
- Class: Insecta
- Order: Mantodea
- Family: Gonypetidae
- Genus: Amantis
- Species: A. gestri

Binomial name
- Amantis gestri Giglio-Tos, 1915

Species of praying mantis

Amantis gestri is a species of praying mantis native to the Philippines.
