= Amantis biroi =

Scientific classification
- Kingdom: Animalia
- Phylum: Arthropoda
- Clade: Pancrustacea
- Class: Insecta
- Order: Mantodea
- Family: Gonypetidae
- Genus: Amantis
- Species: A. biroi

Binomial name
- Amantis biroi Giglio-Tos, 1915

Species of praying mantis

Amantis biroi is a species of praying mantis native to India, the Maluku Islands, Sulawesi, and the Sunda Islands.
