= Amantis lofaoshanensis =

Scientific classification
- Kingdom: Animalia
- Phylum: Arthropoda
- Clade: Pancrustacea
- Class: Insecta
- Order: Mantodea
- Family: Gonypetidae
- Genus: Amantis
- Species: A. lofaoshanensis

Binomial name
- Amantis lofaoshanensis Tinkham, 1937

Species of praying mantis

Amantis lofaoshanensis is a species of praying mantis native to China.
