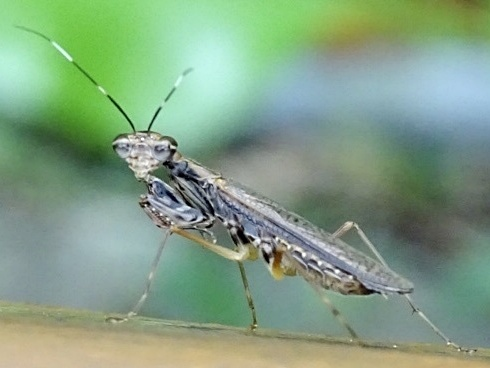
- Spilomantis occipitalis

Scientific classification
- Kingdom: Animalia
- Phylum: Arthropoda
- Clade: Pancrustacea
- Class: Insecta
- Order: Mantodea
- Family: Gonypetidae
- Subfamily: Iridopteryginae
- Genus: Spilomantis; Giglio-Tos, 1915

= Spilomantis =

Genus of praying mantises

Spilomantis is a genus of Asian praying mantids in the family Iridopterygidae. These species were long placed in the genus Hapalopeza, but after a review of type material at the Natural History Museum, London this genus name has been restored.

== Species ==
The Mantodea Species File lists:

- Spilomantis nigripes Werner, 1926
- Spilomantis occipitalis (Westwood, 1889) – type species (as Hapalopeza occipitalis Westwood)
