= Amantis tristis =

Scientific classification
- Kingdom: Animalia
- Phylum: Arthropoda
- Clade: Pancrustacea
- Class: Insecta
- Order: Mantodea
- Family: Gonypetidae
- Genus: Amantis
- Species: A. tristis

Binomial name
- Amantis tristis Werner, 1933

Species of praying mantis

Amantis tristis is a species of praying mantis native to Borneo.
