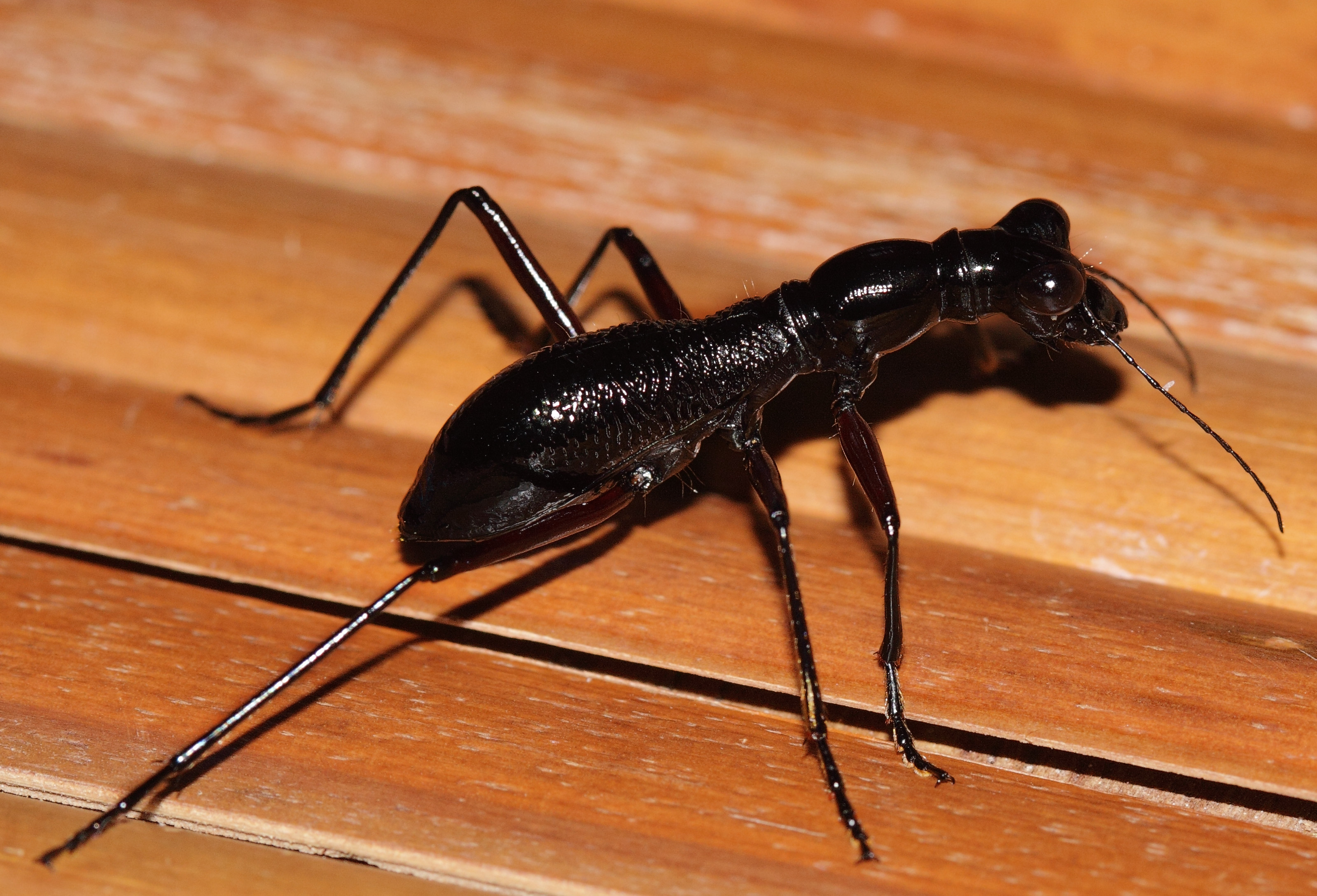
- adult from Raja Ampat, West Papua

Scientific classification
- Kingdom: Animalia
- Phylum: Arthropoda
- Clade: Pancrustacea
- Class: Insecta
- Order: Coleoptera
- Suborder: Adephaga
- Family: Cicindelidae
- Genus: Tricondyla
- Species: T. aptera

Binomial name
- Tricondyla aptera (Olivier, 1790)

= Tricondyla aptera =

Species of beetle

Tricondyla aptera is a beetle species in the family of Cicindelidae. This species is found in Australia, Indonesia, Philippines, Papua New Guinea, and Solomon Islands.
