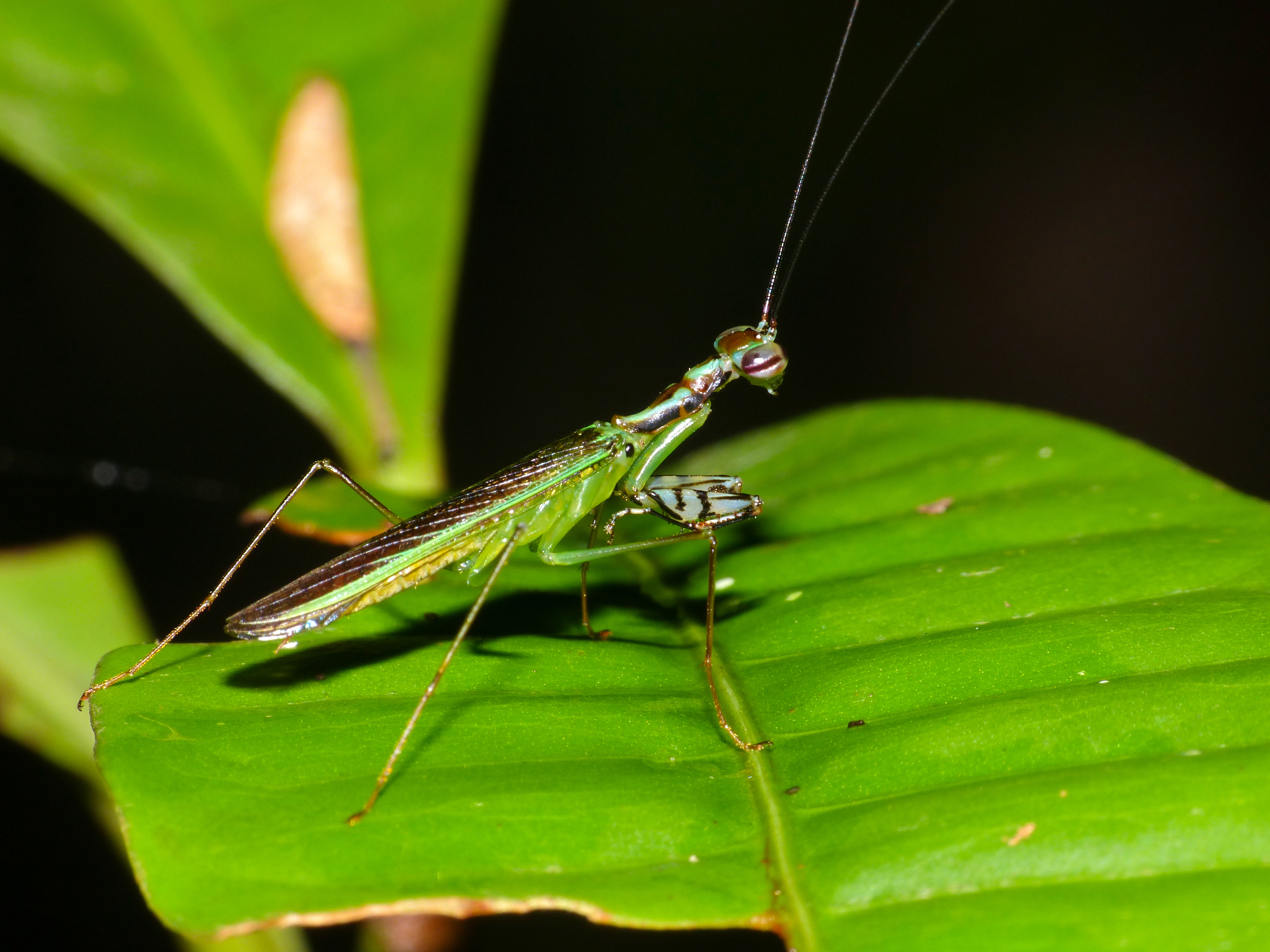
- Hapalopeza sp., Malaysia

Scientific classification
- Kingdom: Animalia
- Phylum: Arthropoda
- Clade: Pancrustacea
- Class: Insecta
- Order: Mantodea
- Family: Gonypetidae
- Subfamily: Iridopteryginae
- Genus: Hapalopeza; Stal, 1877

= Hapalopeza =

Genus of praying mantises

Hapalopeza is an Asian genus of praying mantis in the family Gonypetidae. Two species, previously placed here, are now in the genus Spilomantis.

== Species ==
The Mantodea Species File lists:

- Hapalopeza fulmeki Werner, 1926
- Hapalopeza nigricornis Stal, 1877
- Hapalopeza nilgirica Wood-Mason, 1891
- Hapalopeza nitens Saussure, 1871 - type species
- Hapalopeza periyara Mukherjee & Hazra, 1985
- Hapalopeza tigrina Westwood, 1889
