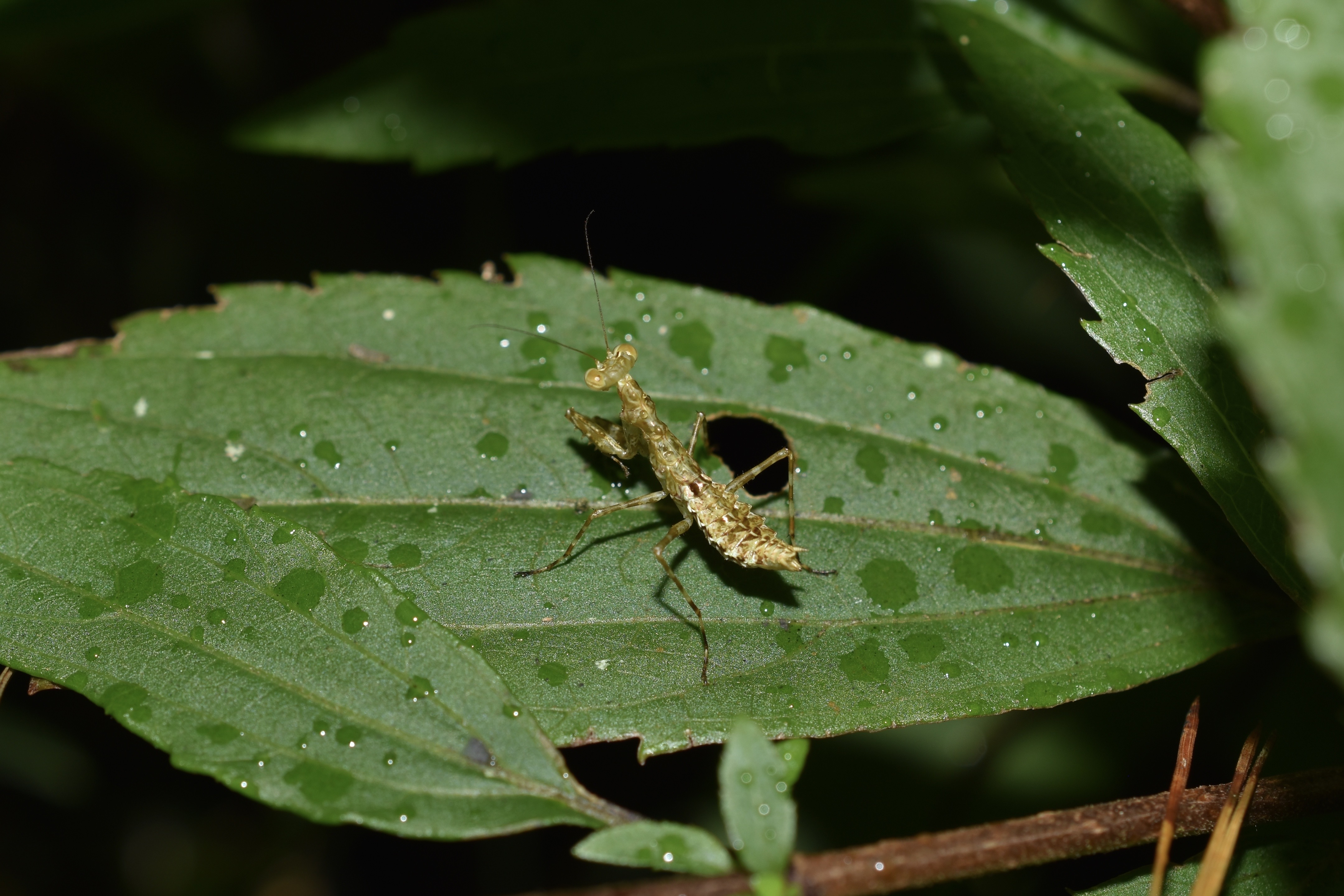
- Female Muscimantis montana in Galway's Land National Park

Scientific classification
- Kingdom: Animalia
- Phylum: Arthropoda
- Clade: Pancrustacea
- Class: Insecta
- Order: Mantodea
- Family: Gonypetidae
- Subfamily: Iridopteryginae
- Tribe: Iridopterygini
- Subtribe: Iridopterygina
- Genus: Muscimantis; Henry, 1931
- Species: M. montana

Binomial name
- Muscimantis montana Henry, 1931

= Muscimantis =

Monotypic genus of praying mantises

Muscimantis is a monotypic genus of praying mantis in the family Gonypetidae , subfamily Iridopteryginae. It is represented by a single species, Muscimantis montana, endemic to the central highlands of Sri Lanka.

== Description ==
The genus and species are characterized by a very small, stout, and micropterous (short-winged) body. The head is distinctive, with prominent eyes and pronounced sculpturing. The vertex features a flattened or concave scutellum bounded by large ocellar tubercles. The pronotum has a deep transverse sulcus and pronounced supra-coxal expansion, with a gibbous (humped) disc on both the prozona and metazona, each slightly medially sulcate. There is no median carina on the pronotum.

The anterior femora are robust with a sinuous dorsal margin. The discoidal spines number three, with the middle one being the largest. The external spines number five, and the internal spines (including a small apical one) number 11 to 13. The anterior tibiae have 8 external and 11 internal spines. The tegmina and wings are very small and oval-shaped. The abdomen features three rows of tuberculate processes on the tergites. The supra-anal plate is triangular, and the cerci are stout, conical, and 8-jointed.

In life, the ground colour is dull green, drying to a greenish-brown. The patterning is complex and variable. Characteristic markings include dark brown on the head with pale greenish blotches on the clypeus and facial scutellum, a mottled median greenish fascia on the pronotum, and marbled forelegs with bronzy-brown blotches. The abdomen has shiny bronzy-black triangular medial blotches on tergites 4–10. The integument is microscopically rugulose on the prothorax, limbs, and lateral areas of the tergites.

Measurements for the hind femur length are 4.3–4.5 mm for males and 5.0–5.2 mm for females.

== Distribution and habitat ==
Muscimantis montana is endemic to Sri Lanka and is known from montane forests above 1,675 meters (5,500 feet) in the central highlands. Holotype and paratype localities are Pidurutalagala, Nuwara Eliya, Ohiya, and Hakgala. It has also been recorded in Galway's Land and Horton Plains National Parks.

The species is found in dense mountain jungle, where individuals are typically captured on masses of green moss festooning tree trunks, to which their coloration closely assimilates.
