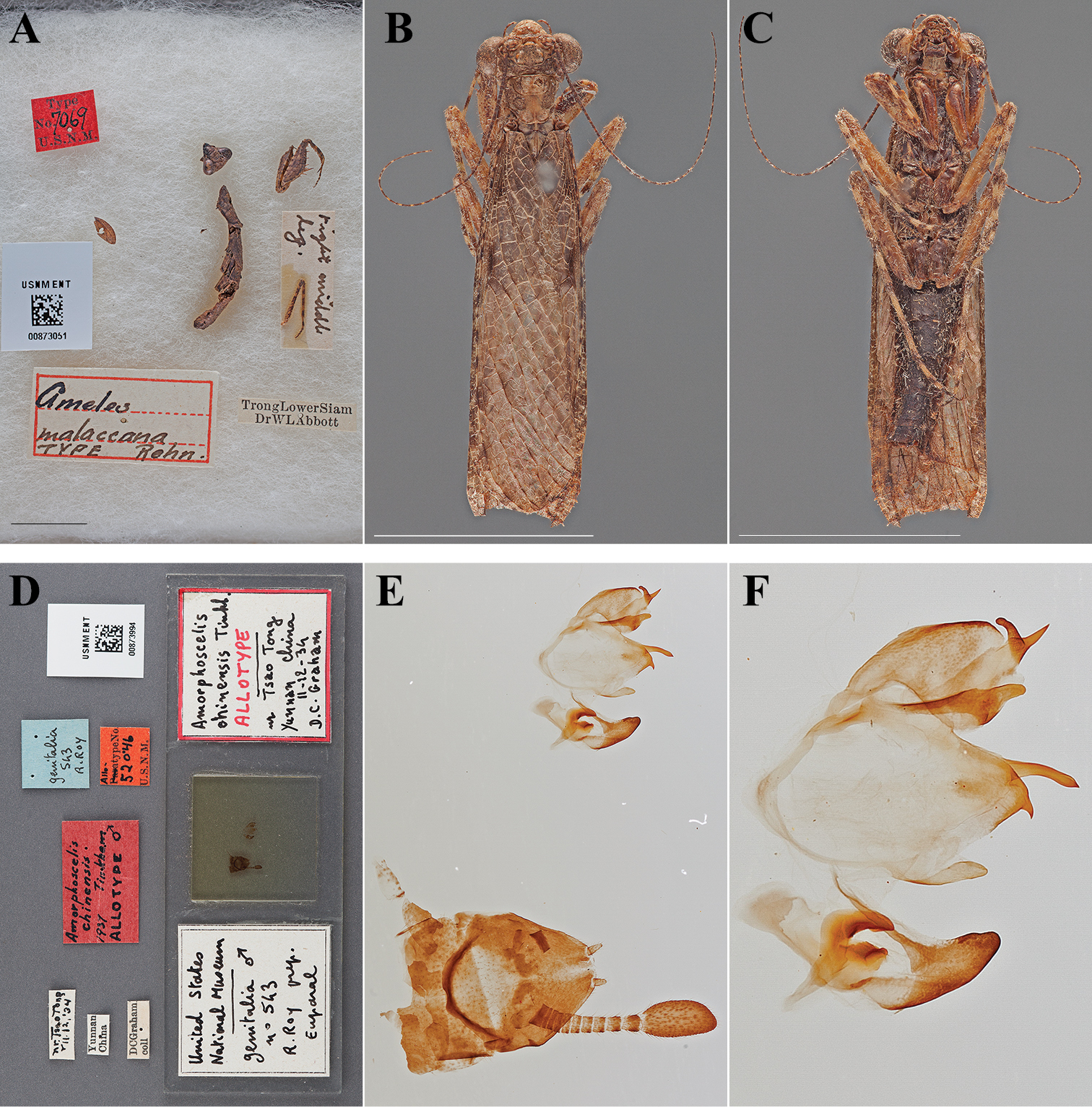
- Type material (Smithsonian Institution).

Scientific classification
- Kingdom: Animalia
- Phylum: Arthropoda
- Clade: Pancrustacea
- Class: Insecta
- Order: Mantodea
- Family: Gonypetidae
- Subfamily: Gonypetinae
- Genus: Bimantis; Giglio-Tos, 1915
- Species: B. malaccana

Binomial name
- Bimantis malaccana (Rehn, 1904)

Synonyms
- Ameles malaccana Rehn 1903

= Bimantis =

Genus of praying mantises

Bimantis is a genus of praying mantises in the family Gonypetidae. It is monotypic, being represented by the single species Bimantis malaccana. Bimantis malaccana was originally described in 1904 as belonging to the genus Ameles and is found in Asia.
