= Tricondyla tuberculata =

Scientific classification
- Kingdom: Animalia
- Phylum: Arthropoda
- Class: Insecta
- Order: Coleoptera
- Suborder: Adephaga
- Family: Cicindelidae
- Genus: Tricondyla
- Species: T. tuberculata

Binomial name
- Tricondyla tuberculata Chaudoir, 1861

Species of beetle

Tricondyla tuberculata is a species of tiger beetle found in India, Bangladesh and Myanmar.

== Description ==
A dull black colored body of 17 to 19 mm long with red legs. It has been recorded from the forests of north-eastern Himalayas. It has red joins on 3rd and 4th joints on antennas.
