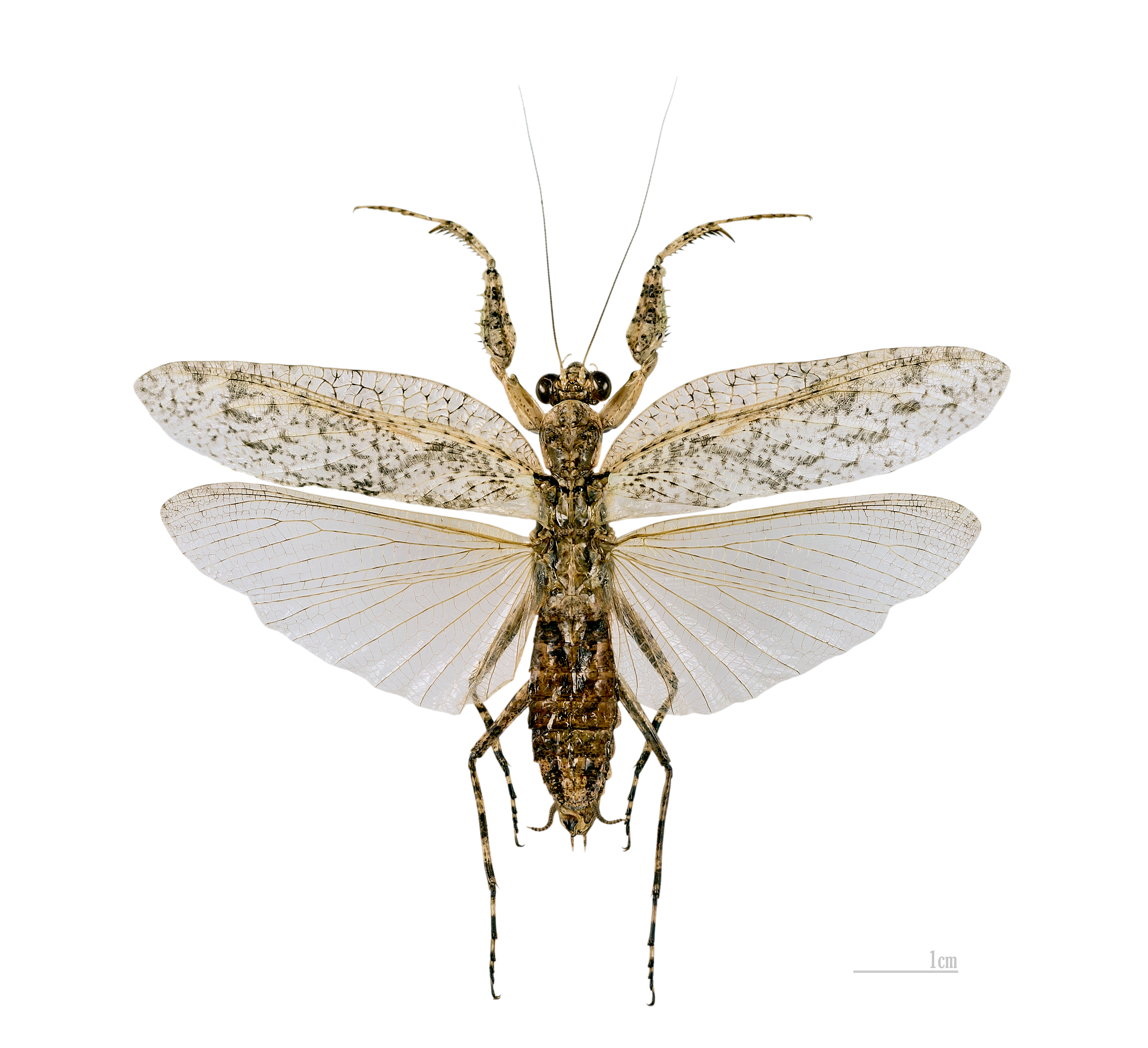
- Theopompa servillei

Scientific classification
- Kingdom: Animalia
- Phylum: Arthropoda
- Clade: Pancrustacea
- Class: Insecta
- Order: Mantodea
- Family: Gonypetidae
- Subfamily: Gonypetinae
- Genus: Theopompa; Stal, 1877

= Theopompa =

Genus of praying mantises

Theopompa is an Asian genus of praying mantids: in the subfamily Gonypetinae.

== Species ==
The Mantodea Species File lists:

1. Theopompa borneana Giglio-Tos, 1917
2. Theopompa burmeisteri Haan, 1842
3. Theopompa ophthalmica Olivier, 1792
4. Theopompa schulzeorum Schwarz, 2021
5. Theopompa servillei de Haan, 1842 - type species
6. Theopompa tosta Stal, 1877

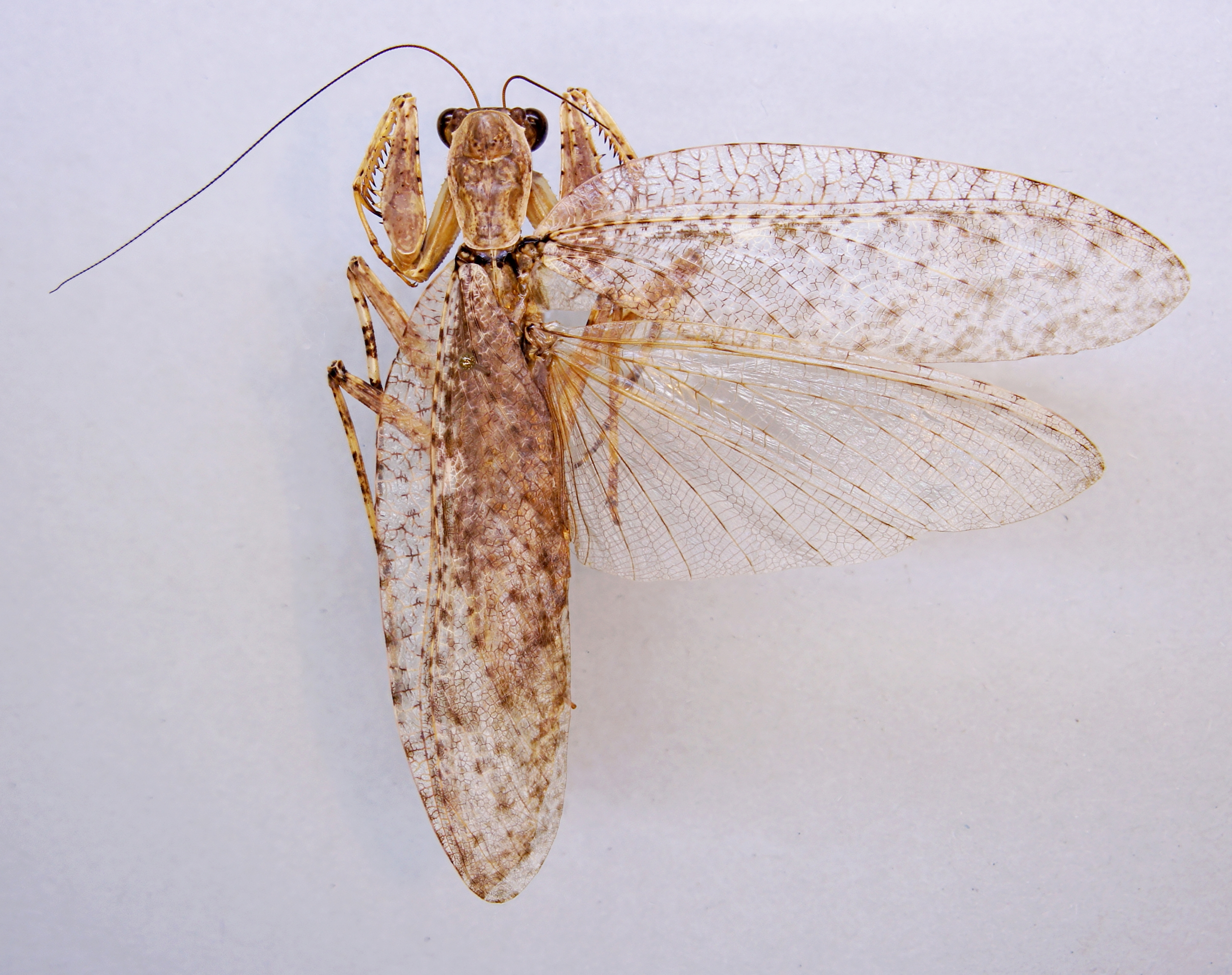
Theopompa borneana
