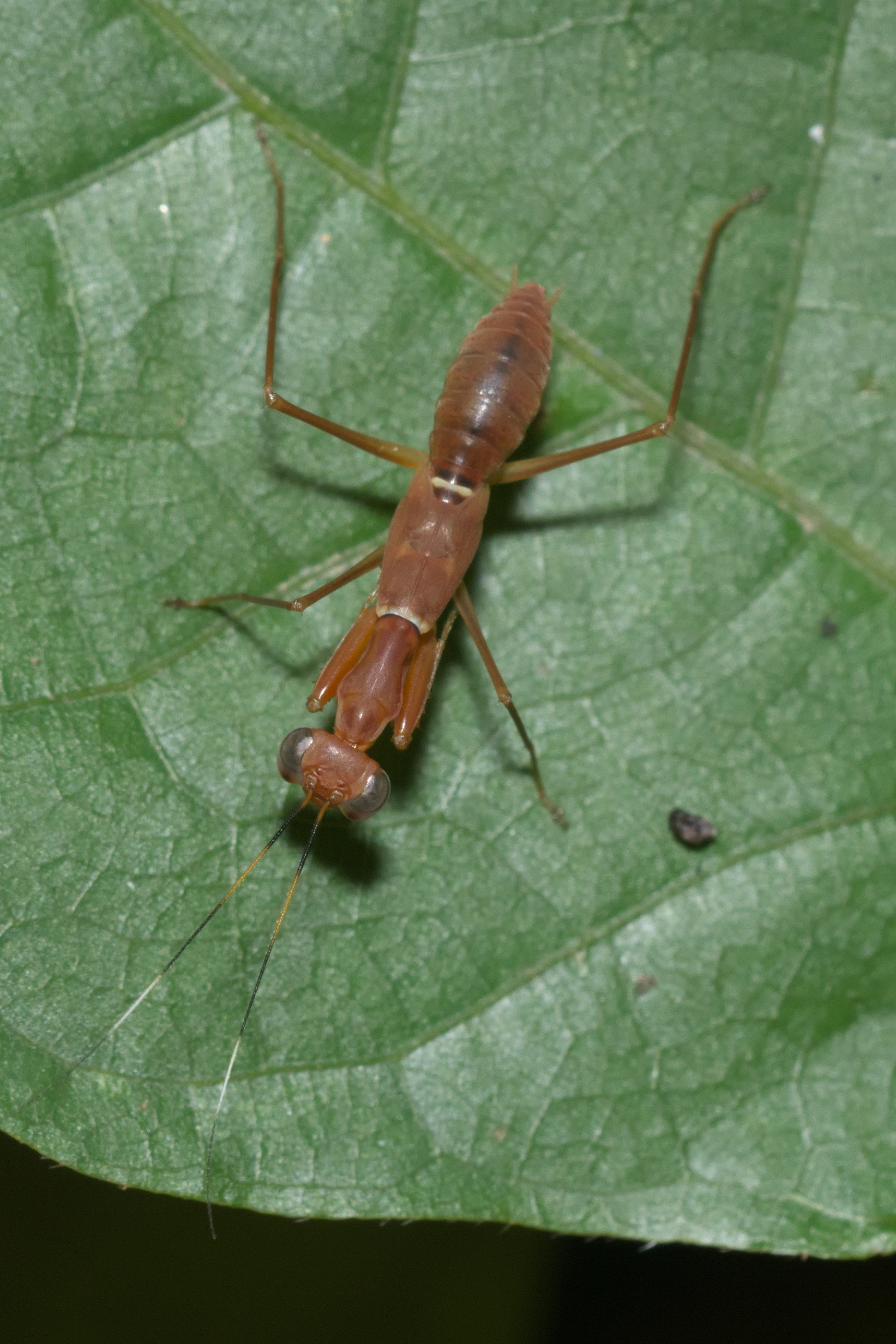
- Nymph of Hapalopeza nilgirica in Kerala, India

Scientific classification
- Kingdom: Animalia
- Phylum: Arthropoda
- Clade: Pancrustacea
- Class: Insecta
- Order: Mantodea
- Family: Gonypetidae
- Genus: Hapalopeza
- Species: H. nilgirica

Binomial name
- Hapalopeza nilgirica Wood-Mason, 1891

= Hapalopeza nilgirica =

Species of insect

Hapalopeza nilgirica is a species of praying mantis in the family Gonypetidae endemic to the Western Ghats of India. The species has been recorded from the states of Kerala, Karnataka, Maharashtra, and Tamil Nadu.

== Taxonomy ==
The species was described by James Wood-Mason in 1891. For several decades, Hapalopeza periyara Mukherjee & Hazra, 1985 was treated as a separate species based on morphological differences. However, a 2025 integrative taxonomic study combining morphology and mitochondrial COI molecular analysis concluded that the diagnostic characters varied continuously within populations and synonymized H. periyara under H. nilgirica.

== Description ==
Hapalopeza nilgirica is a small and agile praying mantis. Nymphs are reddish-brown and resemble Asian weaver ants, an example of ant mimicry that may help reduce predation during early developmental stages. Adults lose the ant-like appearance and develop cryptic coloration better suited for camouflage in vegetation.

== Distribution and habitat ==
The species is endemic to the Western Ghats biodiversity hotspot in peninsular India. Verified observations and taxonomic studies have documented the species from Kerala and other parts of the southern Western Ghats.
