= Dimantis =

Scientific classification
- Kingdom: Animalia
- Phylum: Arthropoda
- Class: Insecta
- Order: Mantodea
- Family: Gonypetidae
- Genus: Dimantis; Giglio-Tos, 1915
- Species: D. haani

Binomial name
- Dimantis haani Giglio-Tos, 1915

Genus of praying mantises

Dimantis is a genus of praying mantises with one identified species, Dimantis haani.

== See also ==
- List of mantis genera and species
