= Gonypeta =

Scientific classification
- Kingdom: Animalia
- Phylum: Arthropoda
- Clade: Pancrustacea
- Class: Insecta
- Order: Mantodea
- Family: Gonypetidae
- Subfamily: Gonypetinae
- Genus: Gonypeta; Saussure, 1869
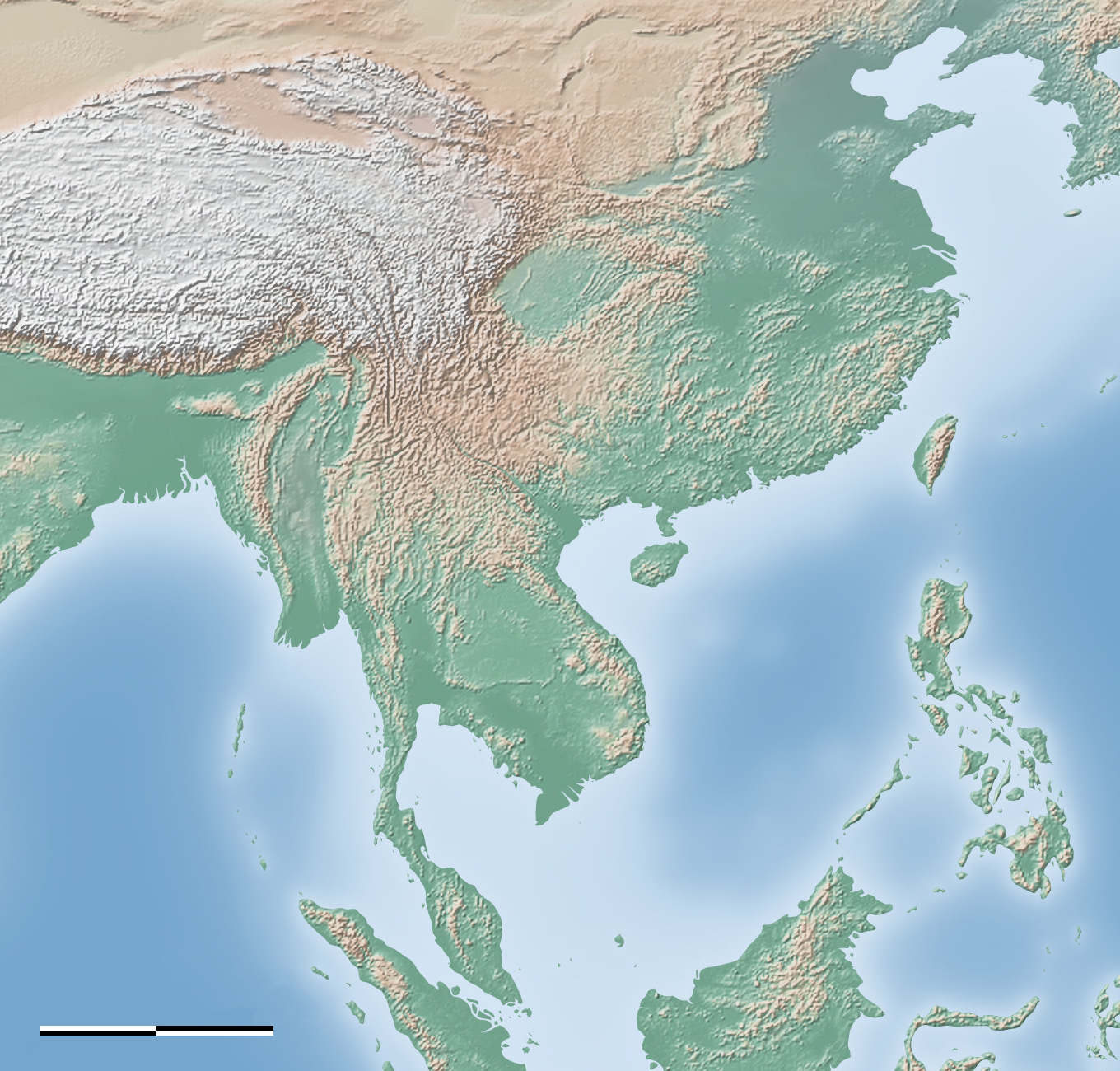
- See GBIF (also has insect pictures)

Genus of praying mantises

Gonypeta is an Asian genus of praying mantids: in the subfamily Gonypetinae.

== Species ==
The Mantodea Species File lists:

- Gonypeta borneana Giglio-Tos, 1915
- Gonypeta brigittae Kaltenbach, 1994
- Gonypeta brunneri Giglio-Tos, 1915
- Gonypeta humbertiana Saussure, 1869
- Gonypeta noctivaga Krauss, 1901
- Gonypeta punctata Haan, 1842 - type species
- Gonypeta rotundata Beier, 1966
- Gonypeta simplex Beier, 1930
