= Compsomantis =

Scientific classification
- Kingdom: Animalia
- Phylum: Arthropoda
- Clade: Pancrustacea
- Class: Insecta
- Order: Mantodea
- Family: Gonypetidae
- Subfamily: Gonypetinae
- Genus: Compsomantis; Saussure, 1872

Synonyms
- Opsomantis Giglio-Tos, 1915

Genus of praying mantises

Compsomantis (from Ancient Greek κομψός (kompsós), meaning "elegant", and "mantis") is a genus of mantises in the family Gonypetidae.

Species are found in South-East Asia and well represented in Indonesia and the Philippines. Species include:

- Compsomantis ceylonica
- Compsomantis crassiceps
- Compsomantis mindoroensis
- Compsomantis robusta
- Compsomantis semirufula
- Compsomantis tumidiceps

== See also ==
- List of mantis genera and species
