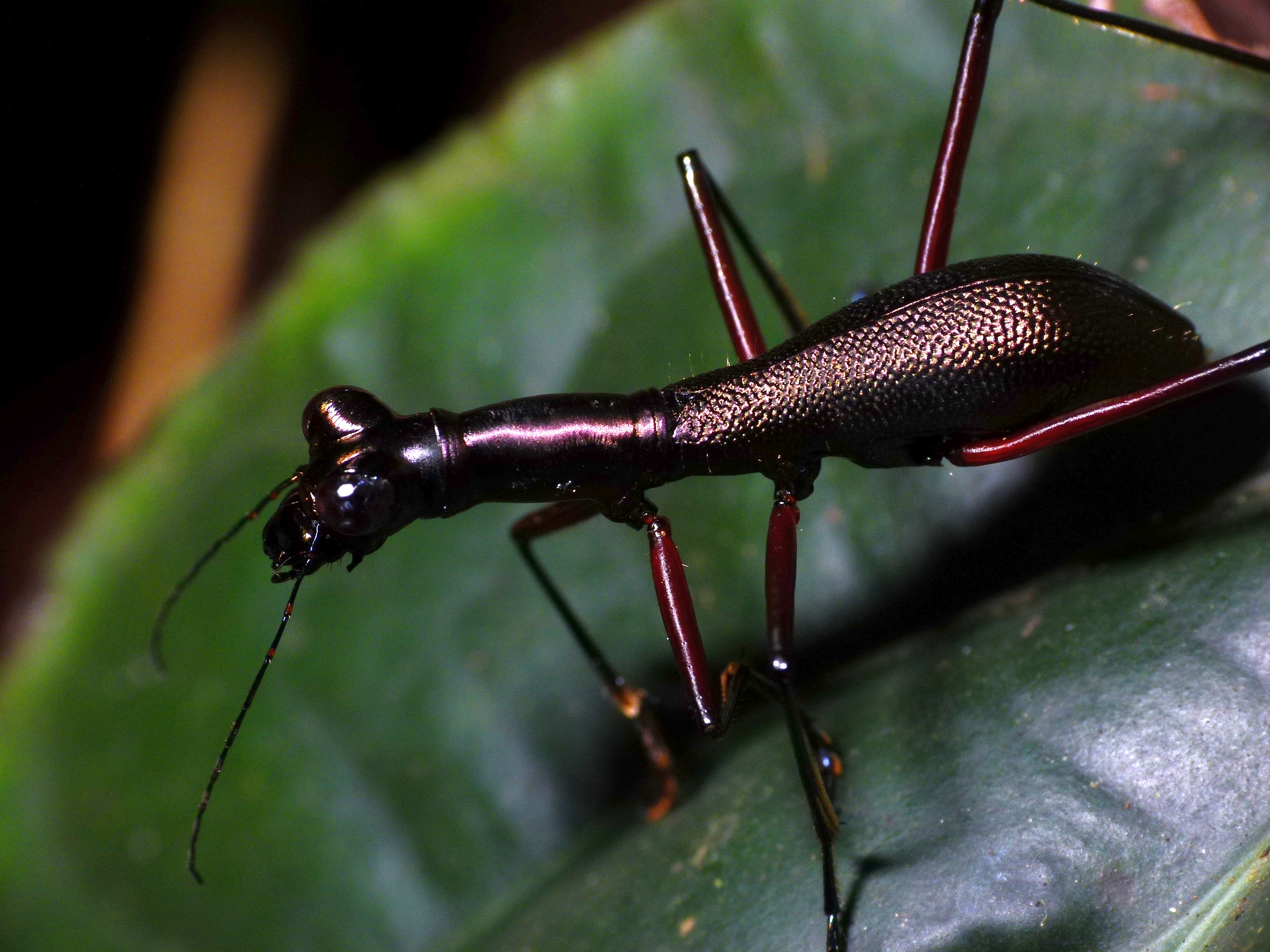

Scientific classification
- Kingdom: Animalia
- Phylum: Arthropoda
- Class: Insecta
- Order: Coleoptera
- Suborder: Adephaga
- Family: Cicindelidae
- Genus: Tricondyla
- Species: T. gounellei

Binomial name
- Tricondyla gounellei Horn, 1900

= Tricondyla gounellei =

Species of beetle

Tricondyla gounellei is a species of tiger beetle found in the forests of southern India and Sri Lanka. It hunts mainly on tree trunks.
