= Tricondyla macrodera =

Scientific classification
- Kingdom: Animalia
- Phylum: Arthropoda
- Class: Insecta
- Order: Coleoptera
- Suborder: Adephaga
- Family: Cicindelidae
- Genus: Tricondyla
- Species: T. macrodera

Binomial name
- Tricondyla macrodera Chaudoir,1860

Species of beetles

Tricondyla macrodera is a species of tiger beetle found in India,China and Burma.

== Description ==
A beetle of 16 to 20 mm long brown and black body with a large head and prominent eyes. The basal joints and femora are red except for apex. The tibia and tarsi are black. Its labrum and mouth parts are usually brownish red. Two subspecies - Tricondyla macrodera subsp. abruptesculpta and Tricondyla macrodera subsp. birmanica were recorded from China and Myanmar.

In India it has been found in the forests of north-eastern Himalayas. It is an arboreal beetle spotted usually on tree trunks.
