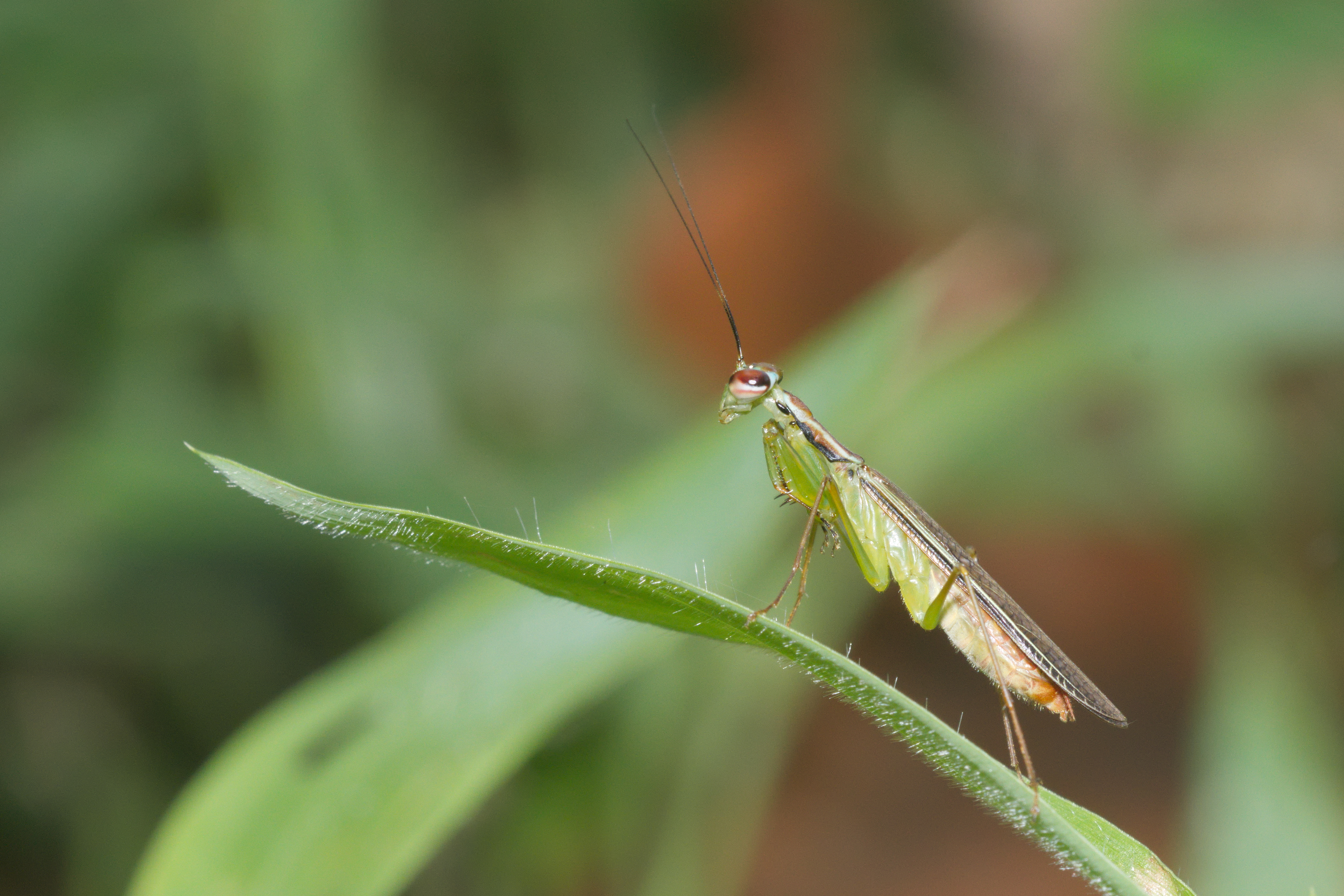
- Hapalopeza nilgirica, Kadavoor

Scientific classification
- Kingdom: Animalia
- Phylum: Arthropoda
- Clade: Pancrustacea
- Class: Insecta
- Order: Mantodea
- Family: Iridopterygidae; Giglio-Tos, 1919

= Iridopterygidae =

Family of praying mantises

Iridopterygidae was a family of praying mantids the members in order Mantodea whose members, having formerly been moved here as a subfamily within Mantidae, have now been transferred elsewhere as part of the recent (2019) major revision of mantid taxonomy.

== Former subfamilies ==
- Hapalomantinae: moved to new family Nanomantidae
- Iridopteryginae: now consists of two tribes in the Gonypetidae
- Nanomantinae: now in new family Nanomantidae contained:
  - Tribe Fulcinini
  - Tribe Nanomantini
- Nilomantinae: now a tribe of Hapalomantinae
- Tropidomantinae: previously containing a single tribe, the Tropidomantini
- genera previously placed incertae sedis here are now the Tropidomantinae.

== See also ==
- List of mantis genera and species
