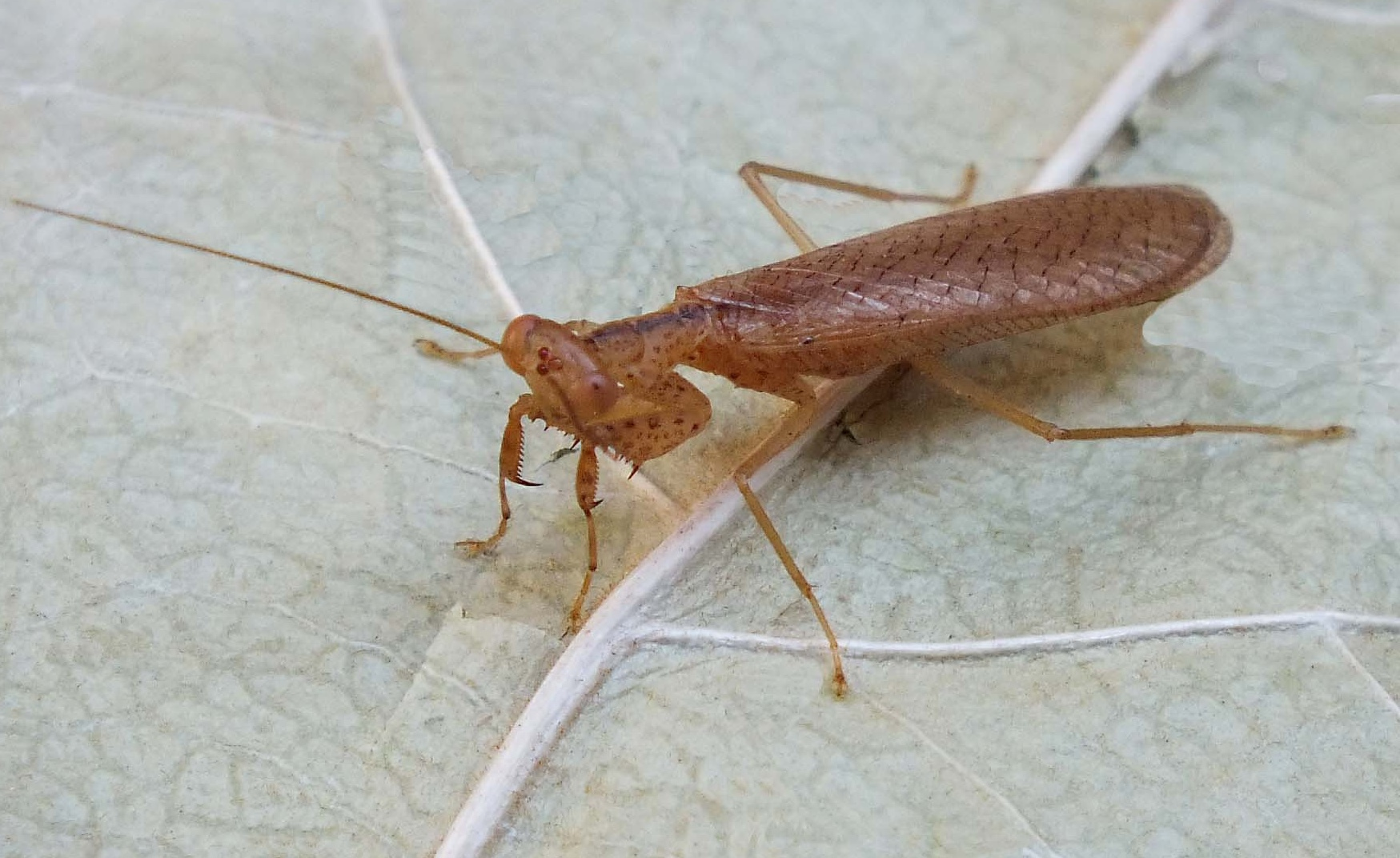
- Amantis reticulata

Scientific classification
- Kingdom: Animalia
- Phylum: Arthropoda
- Clade: Pancrustacea
- Class: Insecta
- Order: Mantodea
- Family: Gonypetidae
- Subfamily: Iridopteryginae
- Genus: Amantis; Giglio-Tos, 1915

Type species
- Mantis reticulata Haan, 1842

Species
- See text

Synonyms
- Cimantis Giglio-Tos, 1915

= Amantis =

Genus of praying mantises

Amantis is a genus of praying mantids native to Asia and the islands of the Pacific Ocean and now belongs to the monotypic tribe Amantini of the subfamily Iridopteryginae.

== Species ==
The following species are recognised in the genus Amantis:

- Amantis aeta Hebard, 1920
- Amantis aliena Beier, 1930
- Amantis basilana Hebard, 1920
- Amantis biroi Giglio-Tos, 1915
- Amantis bolivari Giglio-Tos, 1915
- Amantis fuliginosa Werner, 1931
- Amantis fumosana Giglio-Tos, 1915
- Amantis gestri Giglio-Tos, 1915
- Amantis hainanensis Tinkham, 1937
- Amantis indica Giglio-Tos, 1915
- Amantis irina Saussure, 1870
- Amantis lofaoshanensis Tinkham, 1937
- Amantis longipennis Beier, 1930
- Amantis malayana Westwood, 1889
- Amantis nawai Shiraki, 1908
- Amantis philippina Giglio-Tos, 1915
- Amantis reticulata Haan, 1842 type species (Malesia)
- Amantis saussurei Bolivar, 1897
- Amantis subirina Giglio-Tos, 1915
- Amantis testacea Werner, 1931
- Amantis tristis Werner, 1933
- Amantis vitalisi Werner, 1927
