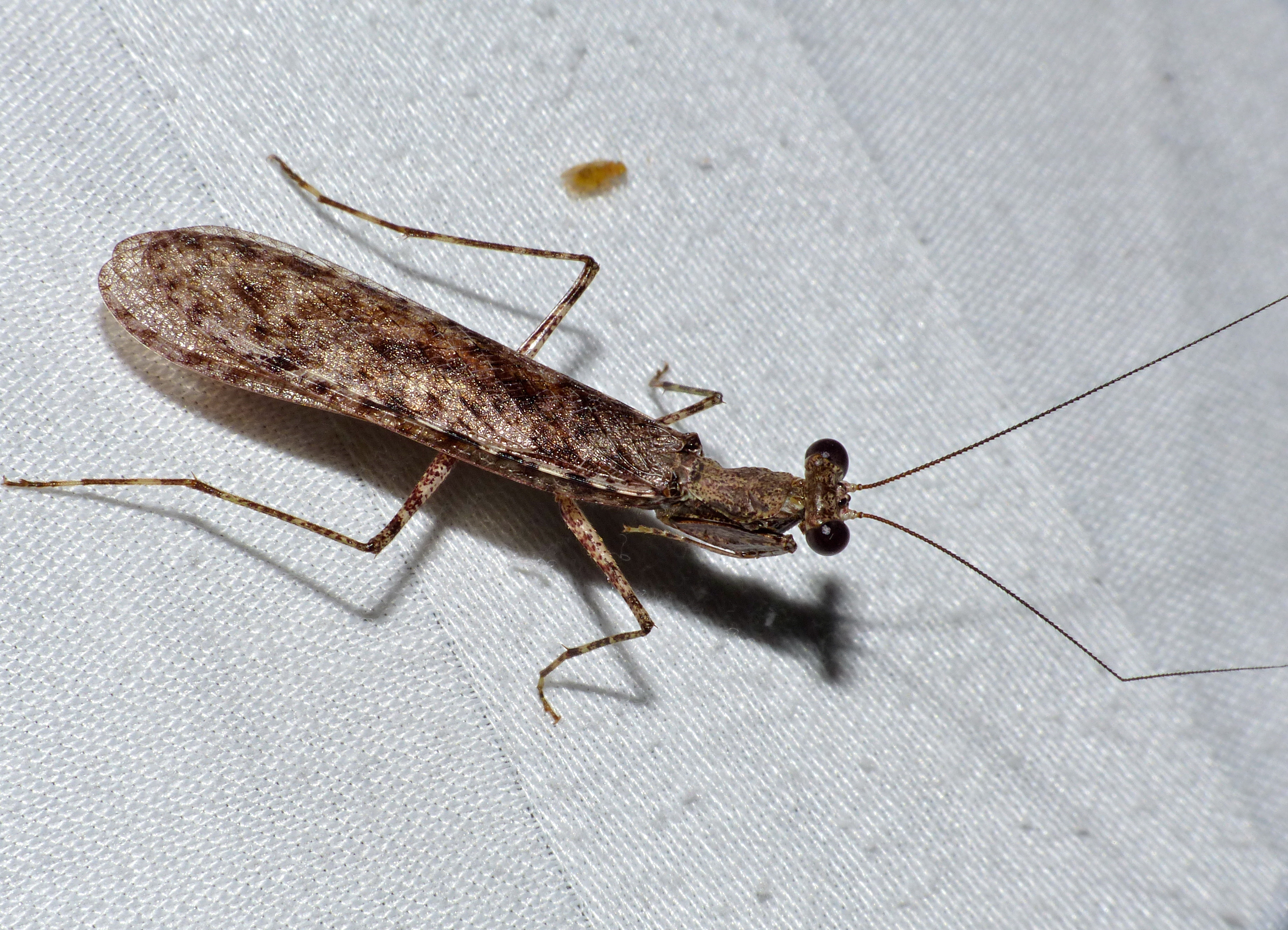
- Gimantis cf. insularis male

Scientific classification
- Kingdom: Animalia
- Phylum: Arthropoda
- Clade: Pancrustacea
- Class: Insecta
- Order: Mantodea
- Family: Gonypetidae
- Subfamily: Gonypetinae
- Genus: Gimantis; Giglio-Tos, 1915

Synonyms
- Eumantis Giglio-Tos, 1915

= Gimantis =

Genus of praying mantises

Gimantis is an Asian genus of praying mantids: in the subfamily Gonypetinae.

== Species ==
The Mantodea Species File lists:

- Gimantis assamica Giglio-Tos, 1915
- Gimantis authaemon Wood-Mason, 1882
- Gimantis insularis Beier, 1937
- Gimantis marmorata Brunner, 1893
