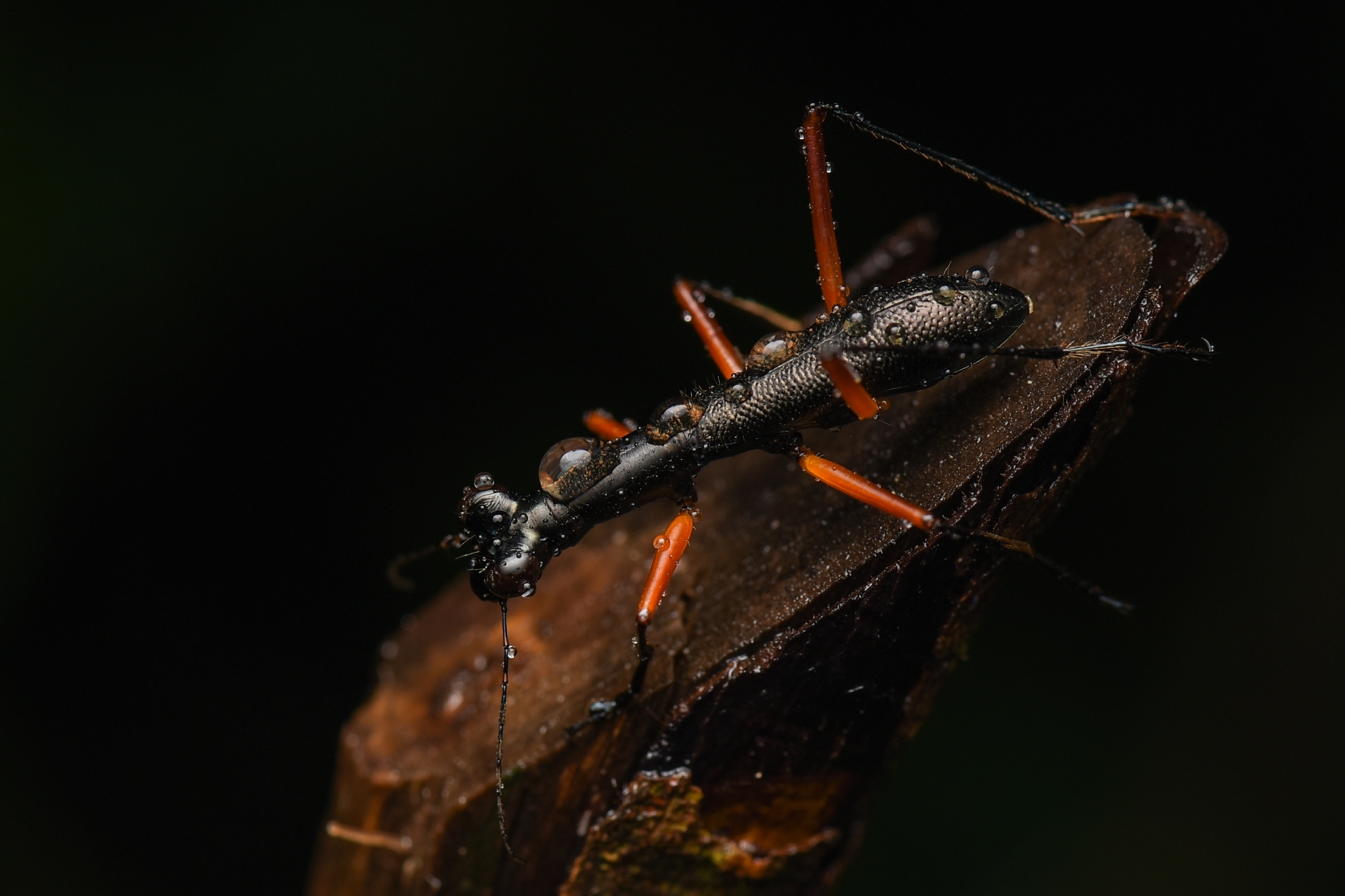

Scientific classification
- Kingdom: Animalia
- Phylum: Arthropoda
- Class: Insecta
- Order: Coleoptera
- Suborder: Adephaga
- Family: Cicindelidae
- Genus: Tricondyla
- Species: T. femorata

Binomial name
- Tricondyla femorata Walker, 1858

= Tricondyla femorata =

Species of beetle

Tricondyla femorata is a species of tiger beetle found in India and Sri Lanka.

== Description ==
The body is shiny black in color with a linear prothorax. It has along pronotum and a black femora with blue colored tarsi and tibiae. Their antenna is short and black colored with red colored 3rd and 4th segment. The body length is more than 19 mm.
