= Gonypetyllis =

Scientific classification
- Domain: Eukaryota
- Kingdom: Animalia
- Phylum: Arthropoda
- Class: Insecta
- Order: Mantodea
- Family: Gonypetidae
- Tribe: Gonypetini
- Genus: Gonypetyllis; Wood-Mason, 1891

Synonyms
- Haldwania Beier, 1930; Paula Liana, 2009

Genus of insects

Gonypetyllis is a genus of mantises belonging to the family Gonypetidae.

Species:

- Gonypetyllis liliputana Beier, 1930
- Gonypetyllis micra (Liana, 2009)
- Gonypetyllis semuncialis (Wood-Mason, 1891)
