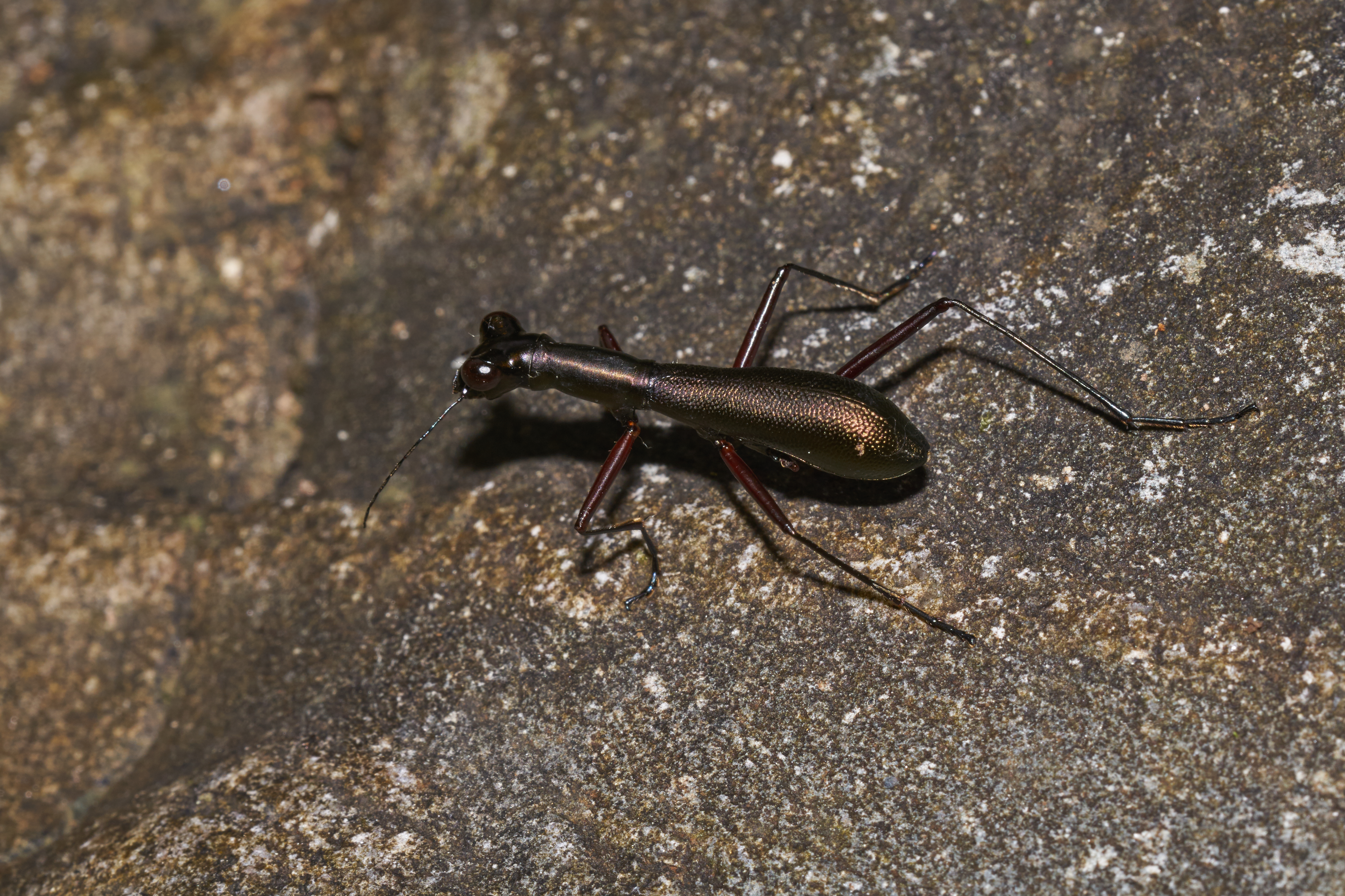
- Tricondyla species, Kerala, India

Scientific classification
- Kingdom: Animalia
- Phylum: Arthropoda
- Class: Insecta
- Order: Coleoptera
- Suborder: Adephaga
- Family: Cicindelidae
- Tribe: Collyridini
- Genus: Tricondyla; Latreille, 1822

Subgenera
- Indotricondyla Naviaux, 2002; Megatricondyla Naviaux, 2002; Pseudotricondyla Naviaux, 2002; Stenotricondyla Naviaux, 2002; Tricondyla Latreille, 1822

= Tricondyla =

Genus of beetles

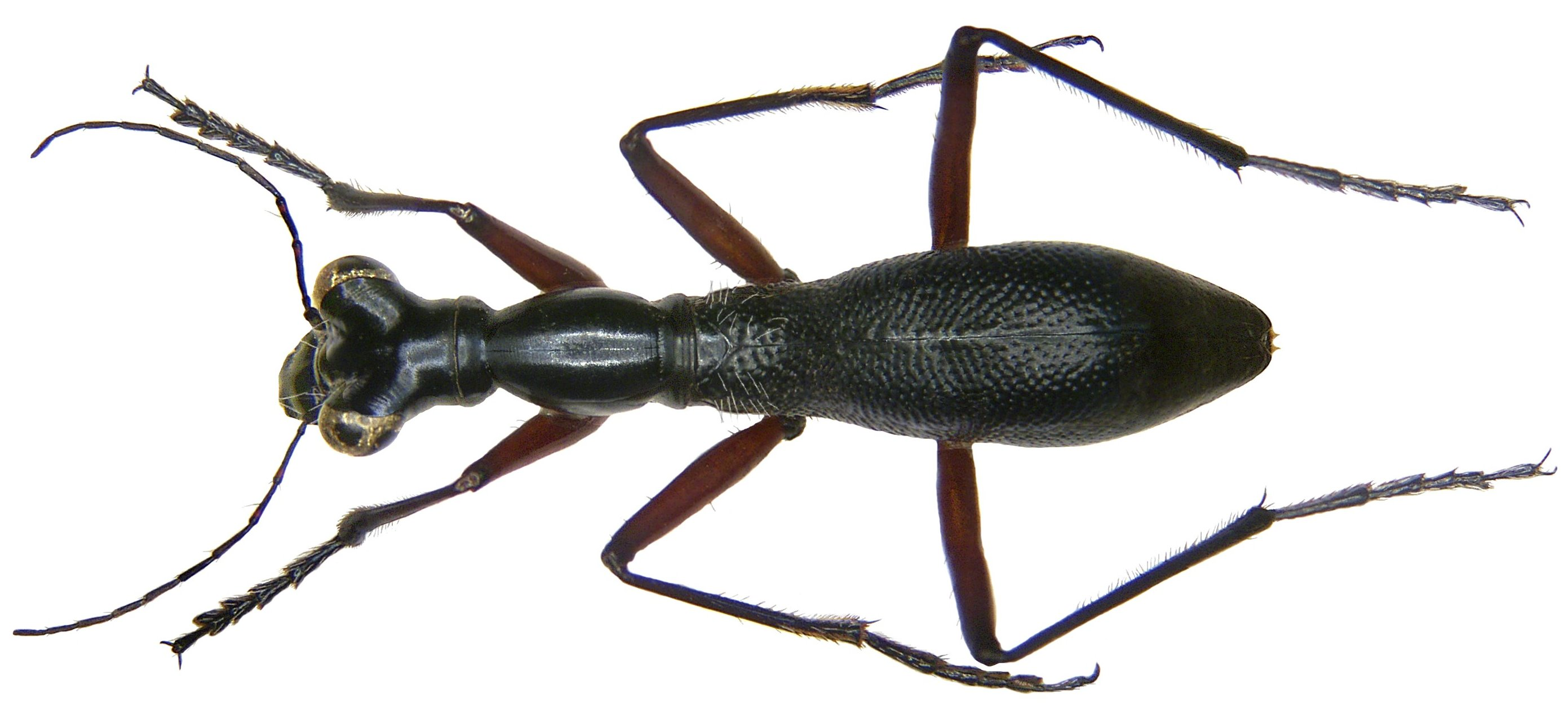
Tricondyla punctulata

Tricondyla is a genus of tiger beetles in the family Cicindelidae. There are more than 40 described species in Tricondyla, found in South and Southeast Asia, and in Oceania.

== Species ==
These 48 species belong to the genus Tricondyla:

- Tricondyla annulicornis Schmidt-Goebel, 1846
- Tricondyla aptera (Olivier, 1790)
- Tricondyla beccarii Gestro, 1874
- Tricondyla bengalensis Naviaux, 2002
- Tricondyla brunnea Dokhtouroff, 1883
- Tricondyla cavifrons Schaum, 1862
- Tricondyla conicicollis Chaudoir, 1844
- Tricondyla coriacea Chevrolat, 1841
- Tricondyla cyanea Dejean, 1825
- Tricondyla cyanipes Eschscholtz, 1829
- Tricondyla darwini Naviaux, 2002
- Tricondyla deuvei Naviaux, 2002
- Tricondyla distincta Fleutiaux, 1894
- Tricondyla doriae Gestro, 1874
- Tricondyla elenae Werner, 1992
- Tricondyla elongata W.Horn, 1906
- Tricondyla femorata Walker, 1858
- Tricondyla fulgida Naviaux, 2002
- Tricondyla genieri Naviaux, 2008
- Tricondyla gestroi Fleutiaux, 1894
- Tricondyla gounellei W.Horn, 1900
- Tricondyla gracilis Naviaux, 2002
- Tricondyla granulifera Motschulsky, 1857
- Tricondyla herculeana W.Horn, 1942
- Tricondyla huloti Naviaux, 2009
- Tricondyla ledouxi Naviaux, 2002
- Tricondyla macrodera Chaudoir, 1861
- Tricondyla magna Werner, 1992
- Tricondyla mellyi Chaudoir, 1850
- Tricondyla mourzinei Naviaux, 2002
- Tricondyla niasensis Naviaux, 2002
- Tricondyla nigripalpis W.Horn, 1894
- Tricondyla oblita Naviaux, 2002
- Tricondyla ovaligrossa W.Horn, 1922
- Tricondyla ovicollis Motschulsky, 1864
- Tricondyla planiceps Schaum, 1862
- Tricondyla proxima Fleutiaux, 1894
- Tricondyla pulchripes White, 1844
- Tricondyla punctulata Chaudoir, 1861
- Tricondyla reducta Naviaux, 2002
- Tricondyla rivalieri Naviaux, 2002
- Tricondyla schuelei Naviaux, 2002
- Tricondyla stricticeps Chaudoir, 1864
- Tricondyla tuberculata Chaudoir, 1861
- Tricondyla ventricosa Schaum, 1862
- Tricondyla wallacei J.Thomson, 1857
- Tricondyla werneri Naviaux, 2002
- Tricondyla wiesneri Naviaux, 2002
