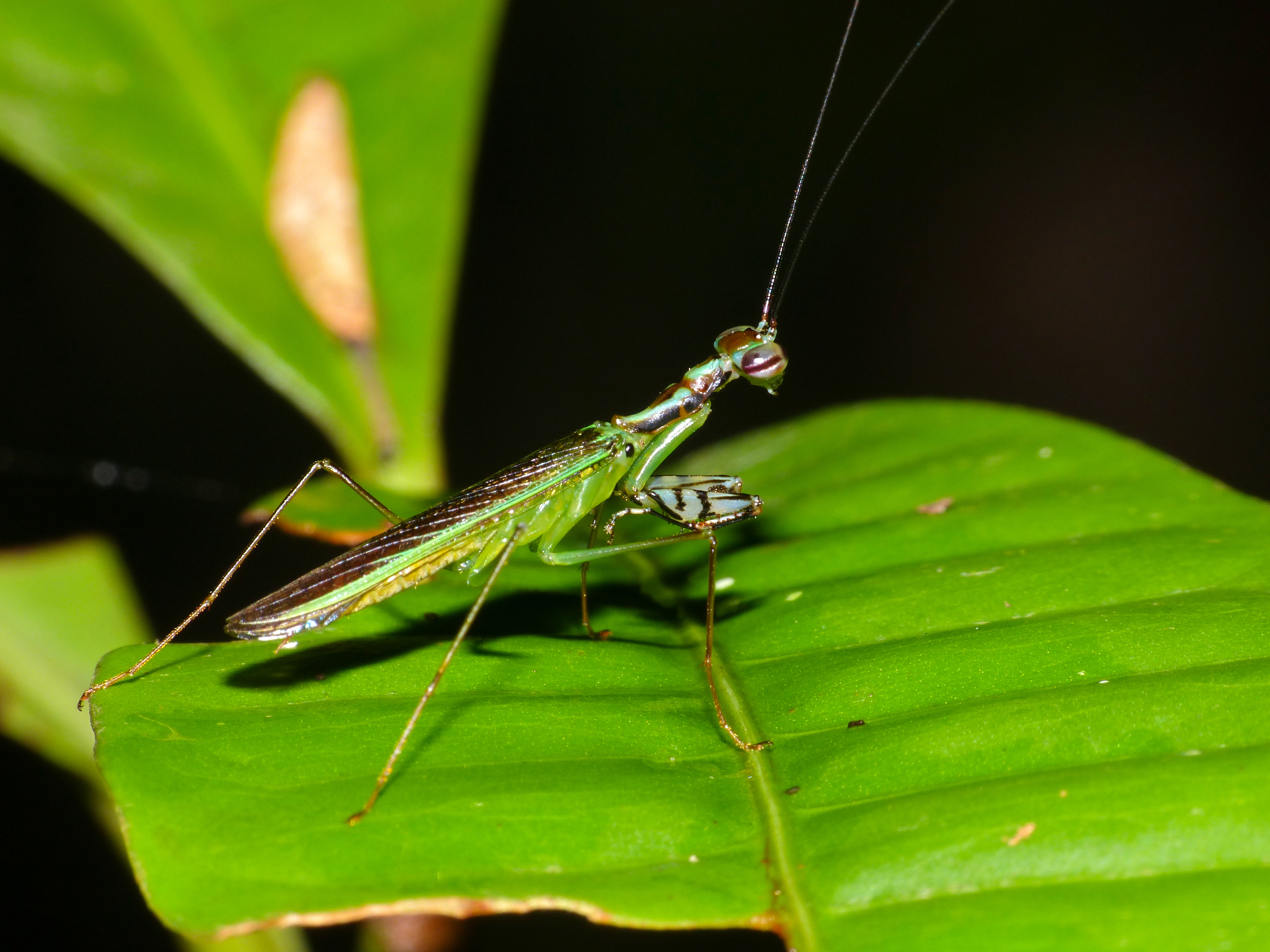
- Hapalopeza

Scientific classification
- Kingdom: Animalia
- Phylum: Arthropoda
- Clade: Pancrustacea
- Class: Insecta
- Order: Mantodea
- Family: Gonypetidae
- Subfamily: Iridopteryginae

= Iridopteryginae =

Subfamily of praying mantises

Iridopteryginae is a subfamily of mantises in the family Gonypetidae. There are two tribes, distributed in tropical Asia.

== Genera ==
The Mantodea Species File lists:

tribe Amantini

- Amantis Giglio-Tos, 1915

tribe Iridopterygini

- subtribe Iridopterygina
  - Hapalopeza Stal, 1877
  - Hapalopezella Giglio-Tos, 1915 (monotypic)
  - Iridopteryx Saussure, 1869 (monotypic: Iridopteryx iridipennis Saussure, 1869)
  - Micromantis Saussure, 1870 (monotypic)
  - Muscimantis Henry, 1931 (monotypic)
  - Pezomantis Uvarov, 1927 (monotypic)
  - Spilomantis Giglio-Tos, 1915
- subtribe Tricondylomimina
  - Tricondylomimus Chopard, 1930
