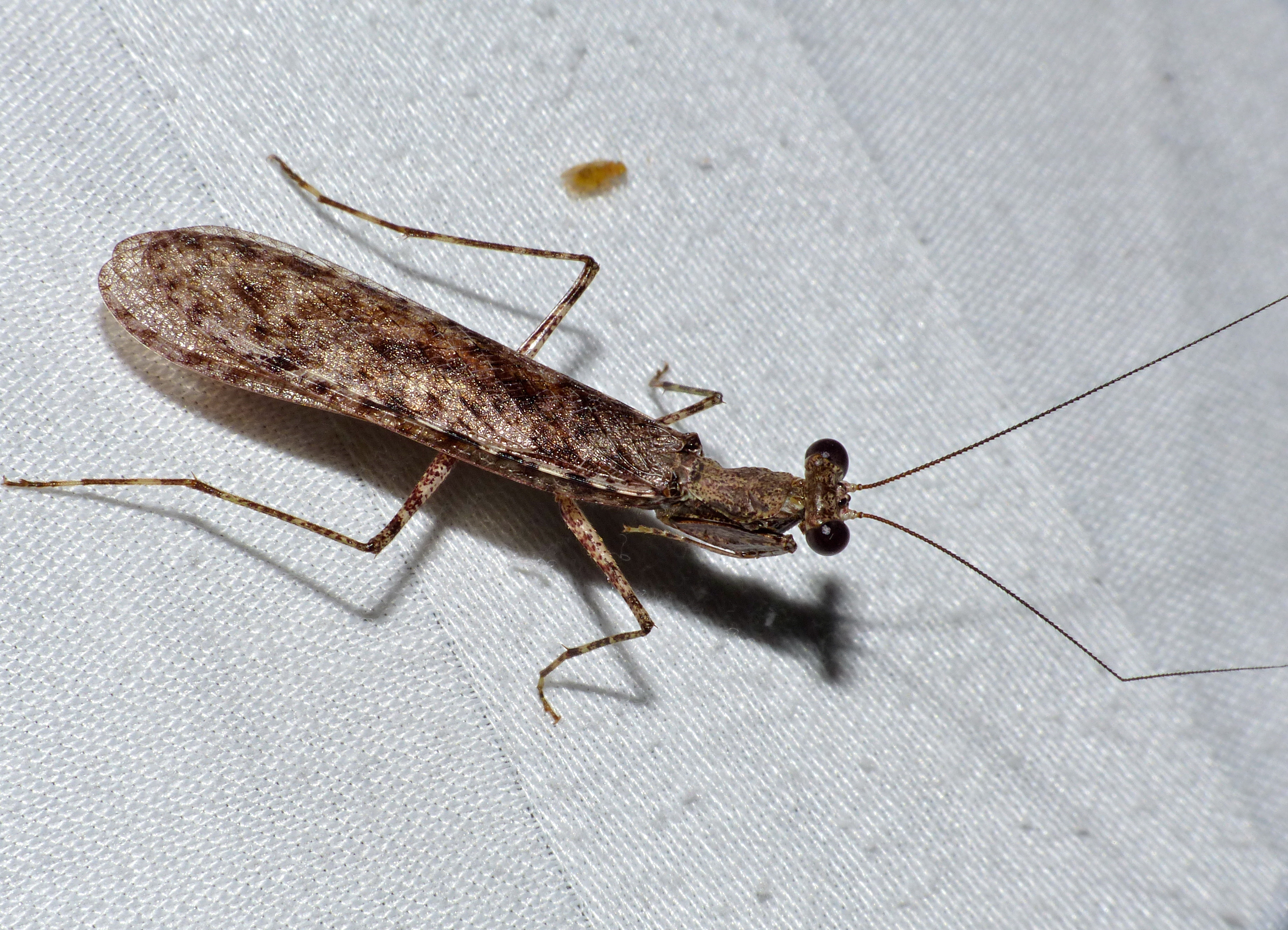
- Gimantis sp.

Scientific classification
- Kingdom: Animalia
- Phylum: Arthropoda
- Clade: Pancrustacea
- Class: Insecta
- Order: Mantodea
- Clade: Metamantodea
- Superfamily: Gonypetoidea; Westwood, 1889
- Family: Gonypetidae; Westwood, 1889

= Gonypetidae =

Family of praying mantises

The Gonypetidae are a family of praying mantids, based on the type genus Gonypeta. The name was created by Westwood and it has been revived as part of a major revision of mantid taxonomy; the subfamily Iridopteryginae having been moved here from the obsolete family Iridopterygidae. The Gonypetinae include Asian genera transferred from the obsolete taxa Amelinae and Liturgusidae.

The new placement is in superfamily Gonypetoidea (of group Cernomantodea) and infraorder Schizomantodea. Genera in this family have been recorded from: NE Africa, the Middle East, India, Indochina, Malesia through to New Guinea.

== Subfamilies, tribes and genera ==
The Mantodea Species File lists two subfamilies:

=== Gonypetinae ===
- tribe Armenini
  - Armene Stal, 1877
- tribe Gonypetini
  - subtribe Compsomantina
    - Compsomantis Saussure, 1872
    - Nigrocincta Anderson, 2024
  - subtribe Gonypetina
    - Bimantis Giglio-Tos, 1915
    - Dimantis Giglio-Tos, 1915
    - Elaea Stal, 1877
    - Elmantis Giglio-Tos, 1915
    - Gimantis Giglio-Tos, 1915
    - Gonypeta Saussure, 1869
    - Gonypetoides Beier, 1942
    - Memantis Giglio-Tos, 1915
    - Myrcinus Stal, 1877
  - subtribe Gonypetyllina
    - Armeniola Giglio-Tos, 1915
    - Gonypetyllis Wood-Mason, 1891
    - Holaptilon Beier, 1964
  - subtribe Humbertiellina
    - Humbertiella Saussure, 1869
    - Paratheopompa Schwarz & Ehrmann, 2017
    - Theopompa Stal, 1877

=== Iridopteryginae ===
- tribe Amantini
  - Amantis Giglio-Tos, 1915
- tribe Iridopterygini
  - subtribe Iridopterygina
    - Hapalopeza Stal, 1877
    - Hapalopezella Giglio-Tos, 1915
    - Iridopteryx Saussure, 1869
    - Micromantis Saussure, 1870
    - Muscimantis Henry, 1931
    - Pezomantis Uvarov, 1927
    - Spilomantis Giglio-Tos, 1915
  - subtribe Tricondylomimina
    - Tricondylomimus Chopard, 1930
