= List of mantids of Sri Lanka =

The following list documents mantises in Sri Lanka.

== Family: Amorphoscelididae - Bark mantises ==
- Amorphoscelis annulicornis
- Amorphoscelis brunneipennis
- Amorphoscelis pellucida
- Amorphoscelis spinosa

== Family: Empusidae - Violin mantises ==
- Gongylus gongylodes

== Family: Gonypetidae - Dwarf mantises ==
- Nigrocincta ceylonica

== Family: Hymenopodidae - Flower mimic mantises ==
- Ambivia popa
- Creobroter apicalis
- Creobroter pictipennis
- Creobroter signifer
- Hestiasula brunneriana
- Hestiasula ceylonica
- Metacromantis oxyops
- Odontomantis micans
- Odontomantis pulchra
- Pseudoxypilus hemerobius

== Family: Iridopterygidae ==
- Hapalopezella maculata
- Iridopteryx iridipennis
- Micromantis glauca
- Muscimantis montana
- Pezomantis henryi
- Tropidomantis (Eomantis) iridipennis

== Family: Liturgusidae ==
- Humbertiella affinis
- Humbertiella ceylonica
- Humbertiella indica
- Humbertiella similis
- Humbertiella taprobanarum

== Family: Mantidae - Praying mantises ==
- Amantis nawai
- Armeniola laevis
- Asiadodis squilla
- Choeradodis strumaria
- Compsomantis ceylonica
- Deiphobe infuscata
- Deiphobella laticeps
- Elmantis lata
- Elmantis trincomaliae
- Heterochaetula straminea
- Hierodula harpyia
- Hierodula membranacea
- Hierodula tenuidentata
- Hierodula unimaculata
- Hierodula versicolor
- Mantis religiosa
- Rhombodera taprobanae
- Schizocephala bicornis
- Statilia maculata
  - Statilia maculata maculata
- Tenodera fasciata

== Family: Tarachodidae ==
- Didymocorypha lanceolata
- Dysaules uvana
- Leptomantella ceylonica
- Oxyophthalma engaea
- Oxyophthalma gracillis

== Family: Thespidae ==
- Parathespis humbertiana

== Family: Toxoderidae ==
- Aethalochroa ashmoliana
- Cheddikulama straminea
- Toxoderopsis spinigera

== See also ==
- Insects of Sri Lanka
- Mantises of Asia
