= Amorphoscelis opaca =

Scientific classification
- Kingdom: Animalia
- Phylum: Arthropoda
- Clade: Pancrustacea
- Class: Insecta
- Order: Mantodea
- Family: Amorphoscelidae
- Genus: Amorphoscelis
- Species: A. opaca

Binomial name
- Amorphoscelis opaca Bolivar, 1908

Species of praying mantis

Amorphoscelis opaca is a species of praying mantis found in Cameroon.

== See also ==
- List of mantis genera and species
