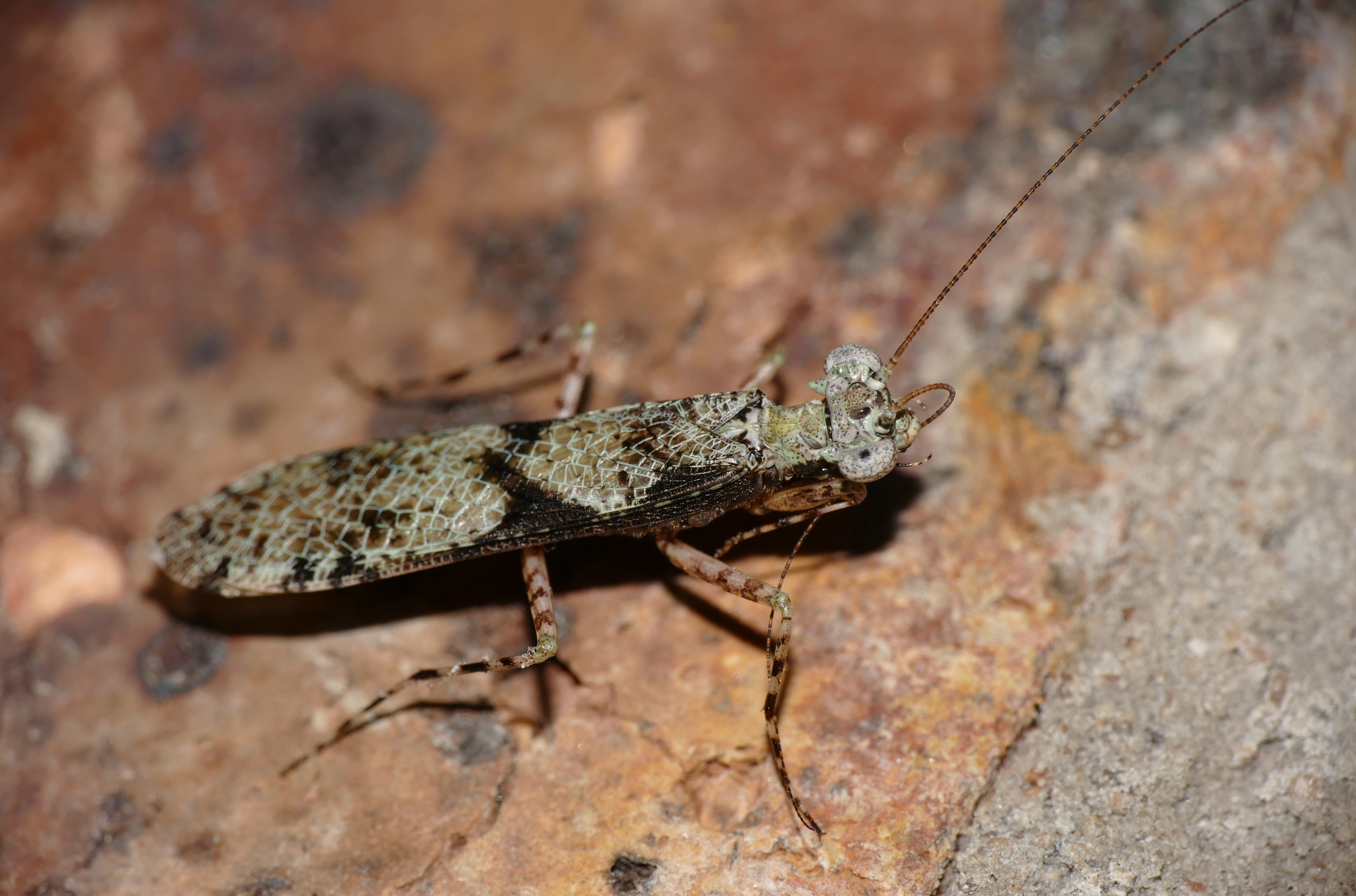

Scientific classification
- Kingdom: Animalia
- Phylum: Arthropoda
- Clade: Pancrustacea
- Class: Insecta
- Order: Mantodea
- Family: Amorphoscelidae
- Genus: Amorphoscelis
- Species: A. tuberculata

Binomial name
- Amorphoscelis tuberculata Roy, 1963

= Amorphoscelis tuberculata =

Species of praying mantis

Amorphoscelis tuberculata, the wart amorphoscelis, is a species of mantis native to Namibia, Mozambique, South Africa (Transvaal), and Zimbabwe.

== See also ==
- List of mantis genera and species
