= Humbertiella (disambiguation) =

Humbertiella may refer to:

- Humbertiella Saussure, 1869 – a genus of insects in the family Liturgusidae
- Humbertiella (plant) Hochr. – a genus of plants in the family Malvaceae
