= Amorphoscelis grisea =

Scientific classification
- Kingdom: Animalia
- Phylum: Arthropoda
- Clade: Pancrustacea
- Class: Insecta
- Order: Mantodea
- Family: Amorphoscelidae
- Genus: Amorphoscelis
- Species: A. grisea

Binomial name
- Amorphoscelis grisea Giglio-Tos, 1931

Species of praying mantis

Amorphoscelis grisea is a species of praying mantis found in Côte d'Ivoire, Cameroon, Guinea and in the Congo River region. It has a body length of 23 mm.
