= Amorphoscelis angolica =

Scientific classification
- Kingdom: Animalia
- Phylum: Arthropoda
- Clade: Pancrustacea
- Class: Insecta
- Order: Mantodea
- Family: Amorphoscelidae
- Genus: Amorphoscelis
- Species: A. angolica

Binomial name
- Amorphoscelis angolica Beier, 1969

Species of praying mantis

Amorphoscelis angolica is a species of praying mantis found in Angola.

== See also ==
- List of mantis genera and species
