= Bolivaroscelis bolivarii =

Scientific classification
- Kingdom: Animalia
- Phylum: Arthropoda
- Clade: Pancrustacea
- Class: Insecta
- Order: Mantodea
- Family: Amorphoscelidae
- Genus: Bolivaroscelis
- Species: B. bolivarii

Binomial name
- Bolivaroscelis bolivarii (Giglio-Tos, 1913)

Synonyms
- Amorphoscelis bolivarii Giglio-Tos, 1913

Species of praying mantis

Bolivaroscelis bolivarii, the Cameroon amorphoscelis, is a species of praying mantis in the family Amorphoscelidae. It is found in Cameroon.

== See also ==
- List of mantis genera and species
