= Amorphoscelis subnigra =

Scientific classification
- Kingdom: Animalia
- Phylum: Arthropoda
- Clade: Pancrustacea
- Class: Insecta
- Order: Mantodea
- Family: Amorphoscelidae
- Genus: Amorphoscelis
- Species: A. subnigra

Binomial name
- Amorphoscelis subnigra Werner, 1933

Species of praying mantis

Amorphoscelis subnigraa is a species of praying mantis found in Borneo.
