= Amorphoscelis singaporana =

Scientific classification
- Kingdom: Animalia
- Phylum: Arthropoda
- Clade: Pancrustacea
- Class: Insecta
- Order: Mantodea
- Family: Amorphoscelidae
- Subfamily: Amorphoscelinae
- Genus: Amorphoscelis
- Species: A. singaporana

Binomial name
- Amorphoscelis singaporana Giglio-Tos, 1915

Species of praying mantis

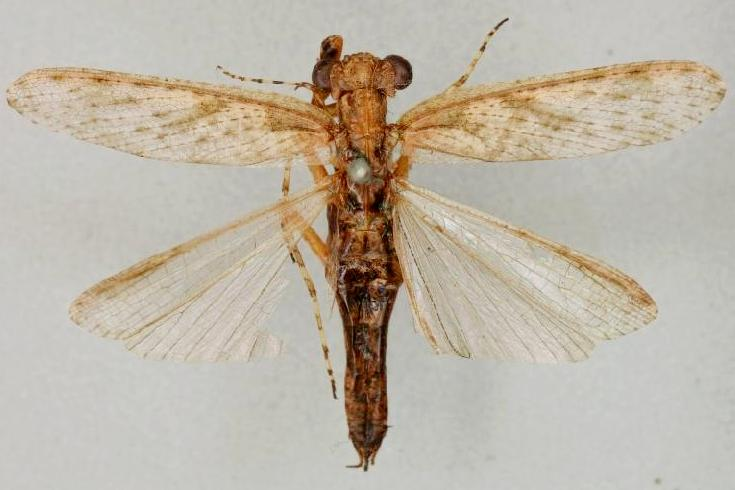
Amorphoscelis singaporana.

Amorphoscelis singaporana is a species of praying mantis found in Singapore, India, Sumatra, and Indo-China (records from Cambodia, Thailand, Vietnam).
