= Amorphoscelis laxeretis =

Scientific classification
- Kingdom: Animalia
- Phylum: Arthropoda
- Clade: Pancrustacea
- Class: Insecta
- Order: Mantodea
- Family: Amorphoscelidae
- Genus: Amorphoscelis
- Species: A. laxeretis

Binomial name
- Amorphoscelis laxeretis Karsch, 1894

Synonyms
- Amorphoscelis horni Giglio-Tos, 1914

Species of praying mantis

Amorphoscelis laxeretis is a species of praying mantis found in Ivory Coast, Ghana, Equatorial Guinea (Fernando Po), and Togo.

== See also ==
- List of mantis genera and species
