= Caudatoscelis marmorata =

Scientific classification
- Domain: Eukaryota
- Kingdom: Animalia
- Phylum: Arthropoda
- Class: Insecta
- Order: Mantodea
- Family: Amorphoscelidae
- Genus: Caudatoscelis
- Species: C. marmorata

Binomial name
- Caudatoscelis marmorata Roy, 1965

Species of praying mantis

Caudatoscelis marmorata is a species of mantis in the family Amorphoscelidae.

== See also ==
- List of mantis genera and species
