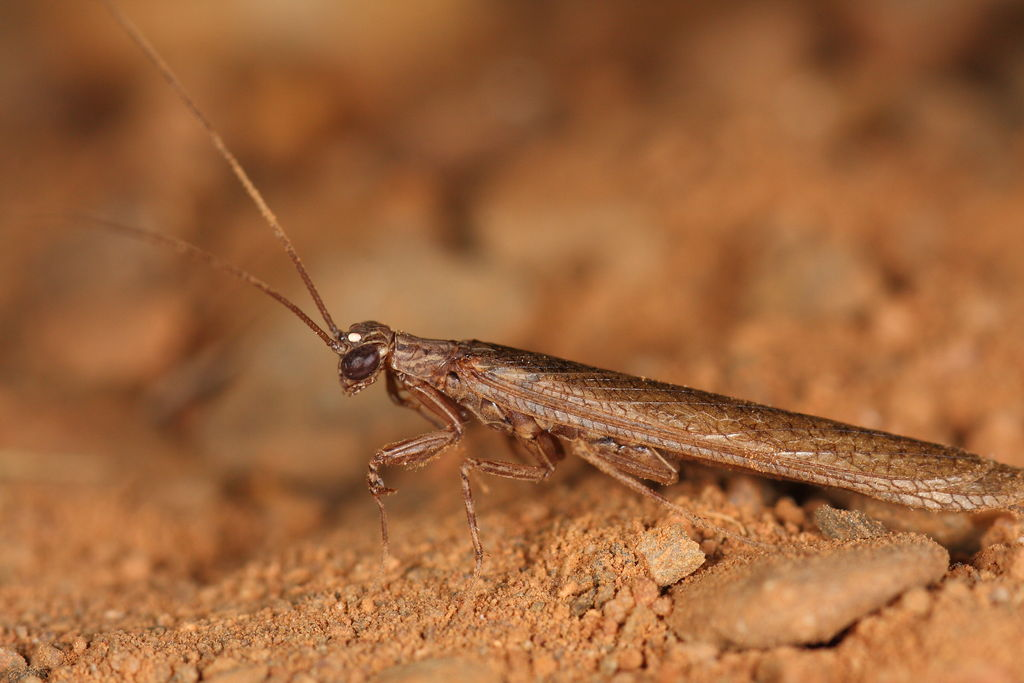

Scientific classification
- Kingdom: Animalia
- Phylum: Arthropoda
- Clade: Pancrustacea
- Class: Insecta
- Order: Mantodea
- Family: Amorphoscelididae
- Subfamily: Perlamantinae
- Genus: Perlamantis
- Species: P. alliberti

Binomial name
- Perlamantis alliberti Guérin-Méneville, 1843

Synonyms
- Perlamantis tunetana Bonnet & Finot, 1884

= Perlamantis alliberti =

Species of praying mantis

Perlamantis alliberti, Allibert's perlamantis, is a species of praying mantis in the family Amorphoscelidae. It is native to the Iberian Peninsula.

== See also ==
- List of mantis genera and species
