= Amorphoscelis siebersi =

Scientific classification
- Kingdom: Animalia
- Phylum: Arthropoda
- Clade: Pancrustacea
- Class: Insecta
- Order: Mantodea
- Family: Amorphoscelidae
- Genus: Amorphoscelis
- Species: A. siebersi

Binomial name
- Amorphoscelis siebersi Werner, 1933

Species of praying mantis

Amorphoscelis siebersi is a species of praying mantis found in Borneo.
