= Amorphoscelis pantherina =

Scientific classification
- Kingdom: Animalia
- Phylum: Arthropoda
- Clade: Pancrustacea
- Class: Insecta
- Order: Mantodea
- Family: Amorphoscelidae
- Genus: Amorphoscelis
- Species: A. pantherina

Binomial name
- Amorphoscelis pantherina Roy, 1966

Species of praying mantis

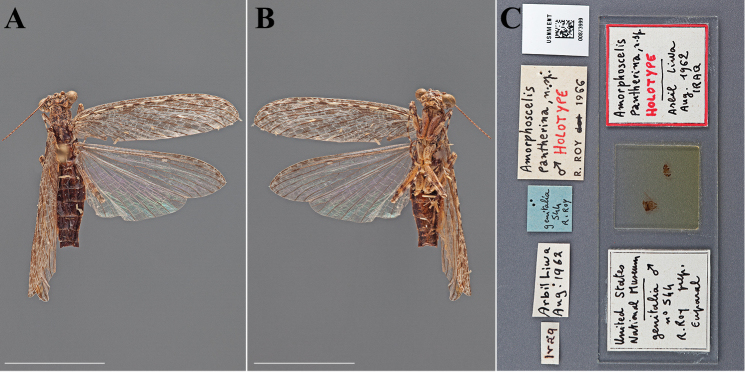
Amorphoscelis pantherina

Amorphoscelis pantherina is a species of praying mantis native to Iraq.
