= Amorphoscelis tigrina =

Scientific classification
- Kingdom: Animalia
- Phylum: Arthropoda
- Clade: Pancrustacea
- Class: Insecta
- Order: Mantodea
- Family: Amorphoscelidae
- Genus: Amorphoscelis
- Species: A. tigrina

Binomial name
- Amorphoscelis tigrina Giglio-Tos, 1913

Species of praying mantis

Amorphoscelis tigrina is a species of praying mantis found in West Africa (Benin, Burkina Faso, Guinea, Cameroon, Nigeria, and Senegal).
