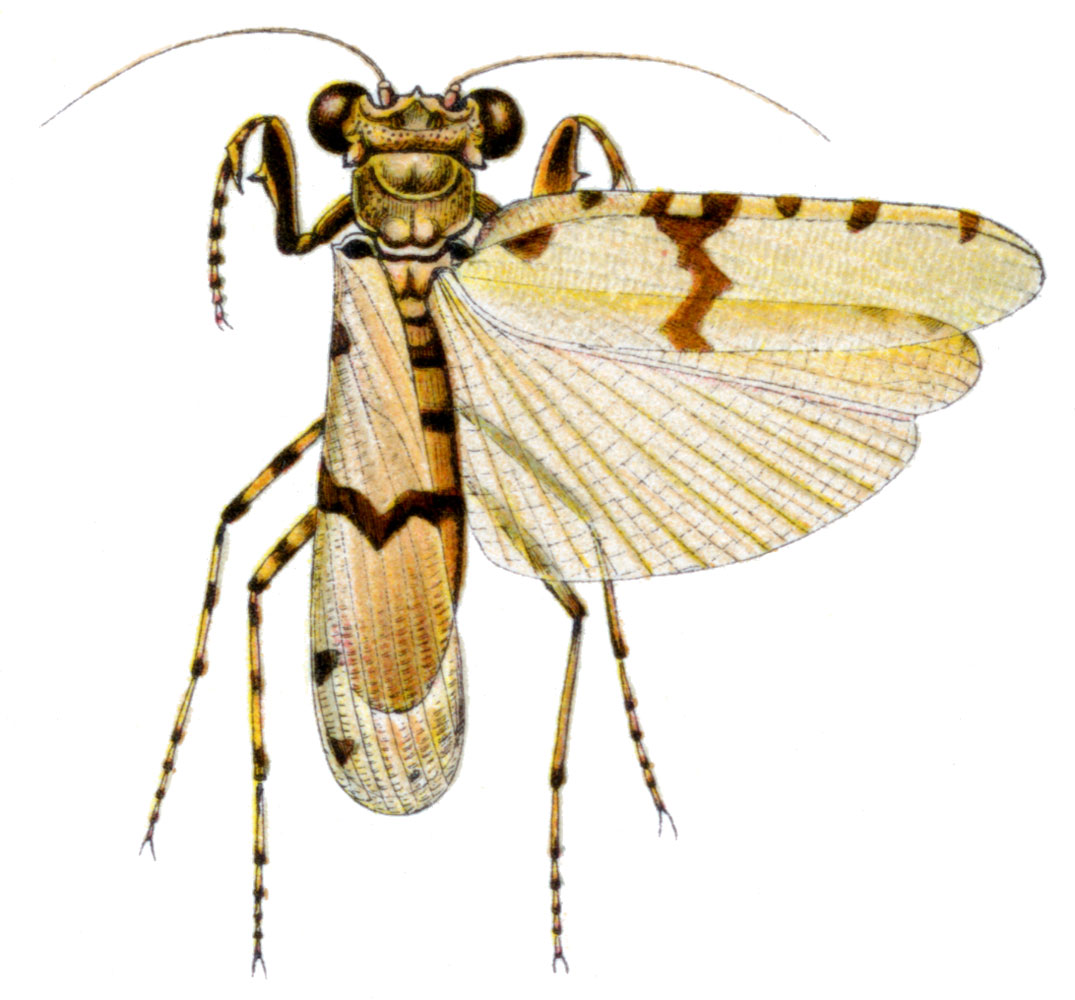

Scientific classification
- Kingdom: Animalia
- Phylum: Arthropoda
- Clade: Pancrustacea
- Class: Insecta
- Order: Mantodea
- Family: Amorphoscelidae
- Genus: Amorphoscelis
- Species: A. pulchella

Binomial name
- Amorphoscelis pulchella Giglio-Tos, 1913

Synonyms
- Amorphoscelis ugandanus Beier, 1931

= Amorphoscelis pulchella =

Species of praying mantis

Amorphoscelis pulchella is a species of praying mantis found in Angola, Uganda, Zimbabwe and the Congo River region.
