= Amorphoscelis orientalis =

Scientific classification
- Kingdom: Animalia
- Phylum: Arthropoda
- Clade: Pancrustacea
- Class: Insecta
- Order: Mantodea
- Family: Amorphoscelidae
- Genus: Amorphoscelis
- Species: A. orientalis

Binomial name
- Amorphoscelis orientalis Giglio-Tos, 1913

Synonyms
- Amorphoscelis turkanensis Chopard, 1938

Species of praying mantis

Amorphoscelis orientalis is a species of praying mantis native to Kenya, Somalia, and Tanzania.

== See also ==
- List of mantis genera and species
