= Bolivaroscelis carinata =

Scientific classification
- Domain: Eukaryota
- Kingdom: Animalia
- Phylum: Arthropoda
- Class: Insecta
- Order: Mantodea
- Family: Amorphoscelidae
- Genus: Bolivaroscelis
- Species: B. carinata

Binomial name
- Bolivaroscelis carinata (Bolivar, 1908)

Synonyms
- Amorphoscelis carinata Bolivar, 1908

Species of praying mantis

Bolivaroscelis carinata is a species of praying mantis in the family Amorphoscelidae.

== See also ==
- List of mantis genera and species
