= Amorphoscelis villiersi =

Scientific classification
- Kingdom: Animalia
- Phylum: Arthropoda
- Clade: Pancrustacea
- Class: Insecta
- Order: Mantodea
- Family: Amorphoscelidae
- Genus: Amorphoscelis
- Species: A. villiersi

Binomial name
- Amorphoscelis villiersi Roy, 1984

Species of praying mantis

Amorphoscelis villiersi is a species of praying mantis native to the Congo River area.

== See also ==
- List of mantis genera and species
