= Maculatoscelis maculata =

Scientific classification
- Kingdom: Animalia
- Phylum: Arthropoda
- Clade: Pancrustacea
- Class: Insecta
- Order: Mantodea
- Family: Amorphoscelidae
- Genus: Maculatoscelis
- Species: M. maculata

Binomial name
- Maculatoscelis maculata (Roy, 1965)

Species of praying mantis

Maculatoscelis maculata is a species of praying mantis in the family Amorphoscelidae. It is found in Ghana and Côte d'Ivoire.

== See also ==
- List of mantis genera and species
