= Amorphoscelis javana =

Scientific classification
- Kingdom: Animalia
- Phylum: Arthropoda
- Clade: Pancrustacea
- Class: Insecta
- Order: Mantodea
- Family: Amorphoscelidae
- Genus: Amorphoscelis
- Species: A. javana

Binomial name
- Amorphoscelis javana Roy, 1966

Species of praying mantis

Amorphoscelis javana is a species of praying mantis found in Java.
