= Amorphoscelis punctata =

Amorphoscelis pulchra

Scientific classification
- Kingdom: Animalia
- Phylum: Arthropoda
- Clade: Pancrustacea
- Class: Insecta
- Order: Mantodea
- Family: Amorphoscelidae
- Genus: Amorphoscelis
- Species: A. punctata

Binomial name
- Amorphoscelis punctata Bolivar, 1908

Species of praying mantis

Amorphoscelis punctata is a species of praying mantis native to Ivory Coast, Ghana, Cameroon, Congo Basin, and Sierra Leone.

== See also ==
- List of mantis genera and species
