= Caudatoscelis collarti =

Scientific classification
- Kingdom: Animalia
- Phylum: Arthropoda
- Clade: Pancrustacea
- Class: Insecta
- Order: Mantodea
- Family: Amorphoscelidae
- Genus: Caudatoscelis
- Species: C. collarti

Binomial name
- Caudatoscelis collarti Roy, 1964

Species of praying mantis

Caudatoscelis collarti, Collart's caudatoscelis, is a species of mantis in the family Amorphoscelidae.

== See also ==
- List of mantis genera and species
