= Bolivaroscelis werneri =

Scientific classification
- Domain: Eukaryota
- Kingdom: Animalia
- Phylum: Arthropoda
- Class: Insecta
- Order: Mantodea
- Family: Amorphoscelidae
- Genus: Bolivaroscelis
- Species: B. werneri

Binomial name
- Bolivaroscelis werneri Roy, 1962

Species of praying mantis

Bolivaroscelis werneri is a species of praying mantis in the family Amorphoscelidae.

== See also ==
- List of mantis genera and species
