= Amorphoscelis papua =

Scientific classification
- Kingdom: Animalia
- Phylum: Arthropoda
- Clade: Pancrustacea
- Class: Insecta
- Order: Mantodea
- Family: Amorphoscelidae
- Genus: Amorphoscelis
- Species: A. papua

Binomial name
- Amorphoscelis papua Giglio-Tos, 1914

Species of praying mantis

Amorphoscelis papua is a species of praying mantis found in New Guinea.
