= Amorphoscelis chinensis =

Scientific classification
- Kingdom: Animalia
- Phylum: Arthropoda
- Clade: Pancrustacea
- Class: Insecta
- Order: Mantodea
- Family: Amorphoscelidae
- Genus: Amorphoscelis
- Species: A. chinensis

Binomial name
- Amorphoscelis chinensis Tinkham, 1937

Species of praying mantis

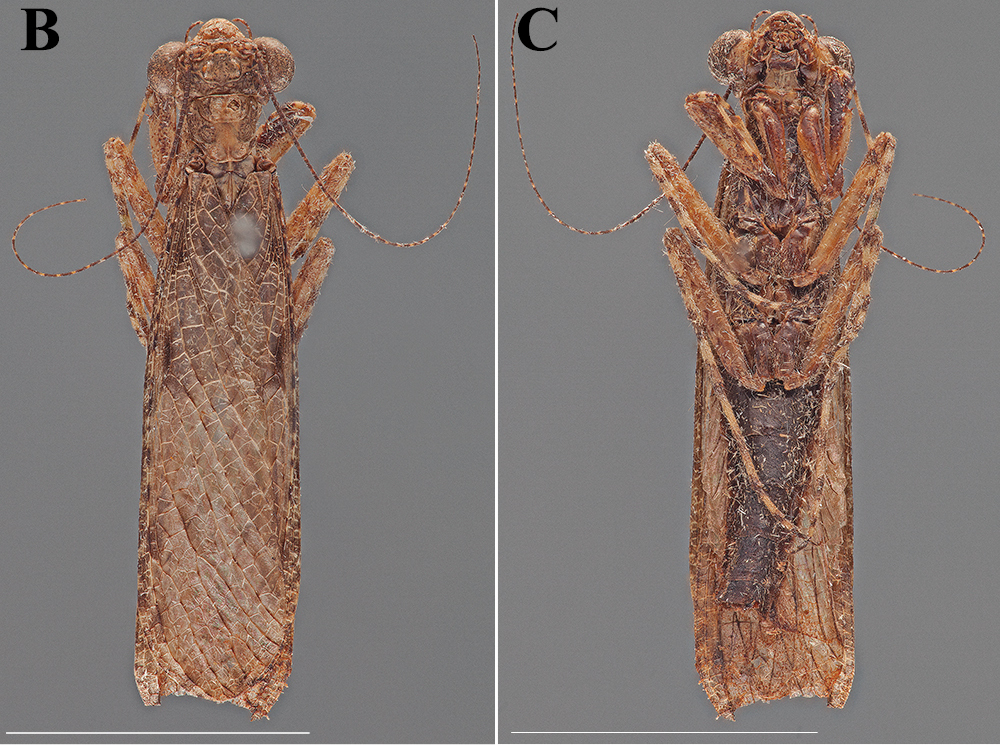
Amorphoscelis chinensis Tinkham

Amorphoscelis chinensis is a species of praying mantis found in China.
