= Amorphoscelis reticulata =

Scientific classification
- Kingdom: Animalia
- Phylum: Arthropoda
- Clade: Pancrustacea
- Class: Insecta
- Order: Mantodea
- Family: Amorphoscelidae
- Genus: Amorphoscelis
- Species: A. reticulata

Binomial name
- Amorphoscelis reticulata Werner, 1933

Synonyms
- Amorphoscelis micans Beier, 1937

Species of praying mantis

Amorphoscelis reticulata is a species of praying mantis that is native to Sarawak.

== See also ==
- List of mantis genera and species
