= Amorphoscelis abyssinica =

Scientific classification
- Kingdom: Animalia
- Phylum: Arthropoda
- Clade: Pancrustacea
- Class: Insecta
- Order: Mantodea
- Family: Amorphoscelidae
- Genus: Amorphoscelis
- Species: A. abyssinica

Binomial name
- Amorphoscelis abyssinica Giglio-Tos, 1914

Species of praying mantis

Amorphoscelis elegans is a species of praying mantis found in Ethiopia, Somalia, and Tanzania.

== See also ==
- List of mantis genera and species
