= Amorphoscelis lamottei =

Scientific classification
- Kingdom: Animalia
- Phylum: Arthropoda
- Clade: Pancrustacea
- Class: Insecta
- Order: Mantodea
- Family: Amorphoscelidae
- Genus: Amorphoscelis
- Species: A. lamottei

Binomial name
- Amorphoscelis lamottei Roy, 1963

Species of praying mantis

Amorphoscelis lamottei is a species of praying mantis found in Ivory Coast, Ghana, Guinea, and in the Congo River area.

== See also ==
- List of mantis genera and species
