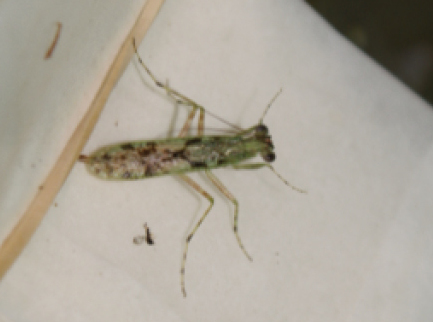
- Amorphoscelis pulchra (male)

Scientific classification
- Kingdom: Animalia
- Phylum: Arthropoda
- Clade: Pancrustacea
- Class: Insecta
- Order: Mantodea
- Family: Amorphoscelidae
- Genus: Amorphoscelis
- Species: A. pulchra

Binomial name
- Amorphoscelis pulchra Bolivar, 1908

= Amorphoscelis pulchra =

Species of praying mantis

Amorphoscelis pulchra is a species of praying mantis native to Ivory Coast, Ghana, Cameroon, Congo Basin, and Sierra Leone.

== See also ==
- List of mantis genera and species
