= Maculatoscelis ascalaphoides =

Scientific classification
- Kingdom: Animalia
- Phylum: Arthropoda
- Clade: Pancrustacea
- Class: Insecta
- Order: Mantodea
- Family: Amorphoscelidae
- Genus: Maculatoscelis
- Species: M. ascalaphoides

Binomial name
- Maculatoscelis ascalaphoides Bolivar, 1908

Species of praying mantis

Maculatoscelis ascalaphoides is a species of praying mantis in the family Amorphoscelidae. It is found in central and western Africa (Angola, Ghana, Guinea, Cameroon, Tanzania, and the Congo River region. They're known as owlfly and they're usually mistaken as dragonflies because of their slender bodies and long membranous wings.

== See also ==
- List of mantis genera and species
