= Amorphoscelis nigriventer =

Scientific classification
- Kingdom: Animalia
- Phylum: Arthropoda
- Clade: Pancrustacea
- Class: Insecta
- Order: Mantodea
- Family: Amorphoscelidae
- Genus: Amorphoscelis
- Species: A. nigriventer

Binomial name
- Amorphoscelis nigriventer Beier, 1930

Species of praying mantis

Amorphoscelis nigriventer is a species of praying mantis found in Côte d'Ivoire, Ghana, and Guinea.

== See also ==
- List of mantis genera and species
