= Amorphoscelis philippina =

Scientific classification
- Kingdom: Animalia
- Phylum: Arthropoda
- Clade: Pancrustacea
- Class: Insecta
- Order: Mantodea
- Family: Amorphoscelidae
- Genus: Amorphoscelis
- Species: A. philippina

Binomial name
- Amorphoscelis philippina Werner, 1926

Species of praying mantis

Amorphoscelis philippina is a species of praying mantis found in the Philippines.

== See also ==
- List of mantis genera and species
