= Amorphoscelis pallida =

Scientific classification
- Kingdom: Animalia
- Phylum: Arthropoda
- Clade: Pancrustacea
- Class: Insecta
- Order: Mantodea
- Family: Amorphoscelidae
- Genus: Amorphoscelis
- Species: A. pallida

Binomial name
- Amorphoscelis pallida Giglio-Tos, 1914

Species of praying mantis

Amorphoscelis pallida is a species of praying mantis found in Cameroon and Nigeria.

== See also ==
- List of mantis genera and species
