= Caudatoscelis caudata =

Scientific classification
- Kingdom: Animalia
- Phylum: Arthropoda
- Class: Insecta
- Order: Mantodea
- Family: Amorphoscelidae
- Genus: Caudatoscelis
- Species: C. caudata

Binomial name
- Caudatoscelis caudata (Giglio-Tos, 1914)

Species of insect

Caudatoscelis caudata is a species of mantis in the family Amorphoscelidae.

== See also ==
- List of mantis genera and species
