= Amorphoscelis austrogermanica =

Scientific classification
- Kingdom: Animalia
- Phylum: Arthropoda
- Clade: Pancrustacea
- Class: Insecta
- Order: Mantodea
- Family: Amorphoscelidae
- Genus: Amorphoscelis
- Species: A. austrogermanica

Binomial name
- Amorphoscelis austrogermanica Werner, 1923

Synonyms
- Amorphoscelis beieri Roy, 1962

Species of praying mantis

Amorphoscelis austrogermanica is a species of praying mantis found in Namibia, South Africa (KwaZulu-Natal, Transvaal), and East Africa.

== See also ==
- List of mantis genera and species
