= Amorphoscelis chopardi =

Scientific classification
- Kingdom: Animalia
- Phylum: Arthropoda
- Clade: Pancrustacea
- Class: Insecta
- Order: Mantodea
- Family: Amorphoscelidae
- Genus: Amorphoscelis
- Species: A. chopardi

Binomial name
- Amorphoscelis chopardi Roy, 1962

Species of praying mantis

Amorphoscelis chopardi is a species of praying mantis found in Côte d'Ivoire and Ghana.
