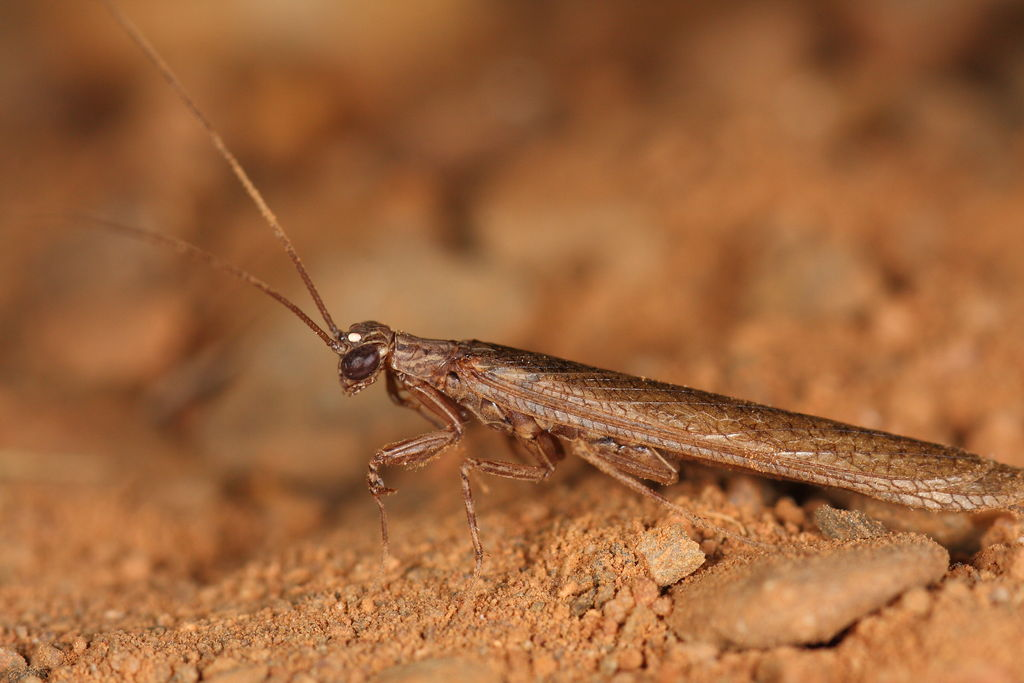
- P. alliberti

Scientific classification
- Kingdom: Animalia
- Phylum: Arthropoda
- Clade: Pancrustacea
- Class: Insecta
- Order: Mantodea
- Family: Amorphoscelididae
- Subfamily: Perlamantinae
- Genus: Perlamantis; Guérin-Méneville, 1843

Synonyms
- Discothera Bonnet & Finot, 1884

= Perlamantis =

Genus of praying mantises

Perlamantis is a genus of praying mantids in the family Amorphoscelidae. Species records are from Northern Africa and the Iberian peninsula.

== Species ==
The following two species are recognised in the genus Perlamantis:

- Perlamantis algerica Giglio-Tos, 1914
- Perlamantis alliberti Guerin-Meneville, 1843 - type species
