= Amorphoscelis brunneipennis =

Scientific classification
- Kingdom: Animalia
- Phylum: Arthropoda
- Clade: Pancrustacea
- Class: Insecta
- Order: Mantodea
- Family: Amorphoscelidae
- Genus: Amorphoscelis
- Species: A. brunneipennis

Binomial name
- Amorphoscelis brunneipennis Beier, 1956

Species of praying mantis

Amorphoscelis brunneipennis is a species of praying mantis found in India and Sri Lanka.
