= Amorphoscelis pellucida =

Scientific classification
- Kingdom: Animalia
- Phylum: Arthropoda
- Clade: Pancrustacea
- Class: Insecta
- Order: Mantodea
- Family: Amorphoscelidae
- Genus: Amorphoscelis
- Species: A. pellucida

Binomial name
- Amorphoscelis pellucida Westwood, 1889

Synonyms
- Amorphoscelis ceylonica Roy, 1965

Species of praying mantis

Amorphoscelis pellucida is a species of praying mantis native to Australia, Indonesia (Java), and Singapore.

== See also ==
- List of mantis genera and species
