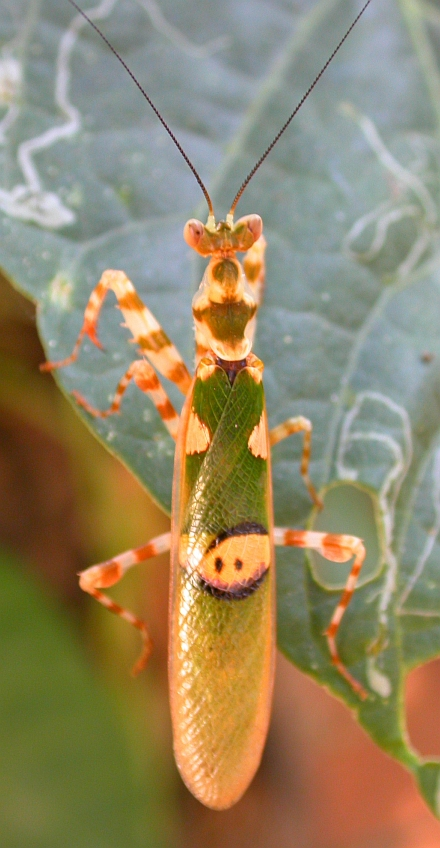
- Creobroter gemmatus

Scientific classification
- Kingdom: Animalia
- Phylum: Arthropoda
- Clade: Pancrustacea
- Class: Insecta
- Order: Mantodea
- Family: Hymenopodidae
- Tribe: Hymenopodini
- Genus: Creobroter; Serville, 1839

Type species
- Harpax (Creobroter) discifera Serville, 1839

Species
- see text

Synonyms
- Creoboter Burmeister, 1840; Creobotra Saussure, 1869; Creobrotra Saussure, 1898

= Creobroter =

Flower mantis

Genus of praying mantises

Creobroter is a genus of flower mantises in the tribe Hymenopodini; species are concentrated in Asia. The generic name comes from the Greek kreo-, meaning "flesh") and broter, meaning "eating", so "flesh-eating", an apt name for a predatory insect. Both sexes have long wings and are capable fliers. Full-grown males are about 3 to 4 cm in length; females are about 4 to 5 cm.

== Camouflage and mimicry ==
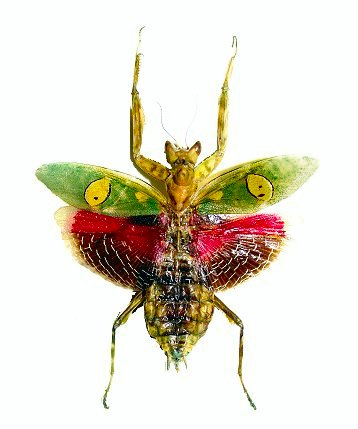
Preserved Creobroter gemmatus with open wings

As the common name indicates, Creobroter species are known for having varicolored (yellow, white, red, brown, etc.) markings, which serve as camouflage by hiding the creatures' actual shapes and making them look somewhat like flowers when hiding in green foliage.

The resemblance to flowers may be greater in subadults of Creobroter than adults. This flower mimicry is only partial, but is attractive enough to make Creobroter species favored as pets, especially as they are more common and less delicate than the more flower-like Hymenopus.

In some species (such as C. gemmatus), these markings also serve as eyespots when the mantis spreads its wings in a deimatic display.

Rather than resembling foliage or flowers, some species of Creobroter resemble ants during their early nymphal stages. Ant mimicry is a useful defense against predation for the young, as most ants are relatively unpalatable and aggressive, making insect predators that rely on vision to identify their prey, such as birds and wasps, avoid them.

Around their third ecdysis, Creobroter species trade their ant-mimicking, dark, shiny appearance for the green and light-colored markings that make their outline difficult to discern in vegetation.

== Species ==
No consistency is seen for the use of English common names for these species. For example, at least two Creobroter species found in India have been called "Indian flower mantis". Conversely, a Creobroter species collected in Thailand might be displayed in a collection as a "Thai flower mantis", while the same species collected elsewhere might be called a "Malaysian flower mantis". The following species of Creobroter are described (subject to review):

- Creobroter apicalis Saussure, 1869 (synonym Creobroter elongatus (Beier, 1929))
- Creobroter celebensis Werner, 1931
- Creobroter discifera Serville, 1839 - type species
- Creobroter episcopalis Stal, 1877
- Creobroter fasciatus Werner, 1927
- Creobroter fuscoareatus Saussure, 1870
- Creobroter gemmatus Saussure, 1869
- Creobroter granulicollis Saussure, 1870
- Creobroter insolitus Beier, 1942
- Creobroter jiangxiensis Zheng, 1988
- Creobroter labuanae Hebard, 1920
- Creobroter laevicollis Saussure, 1870
- Creobroter medanus Giglio-Tos, 1915
- Creobroter meleagris Stal, 1877
- Creobroter nebulosa Zheng, 1988
- Creobroter pictipennis Wood-Mason, 1878
- Creobroter signifer Walker, 1859
- Creobroter sumatranus de Haan, 1842
- Creobroter urbanus Fabricius, 1775
- Creobroter vitripennis Beier, 1933

== See also ==
- List of mantis genera and species
