= Maculatoscelis =

Scientific classification
- Kingdom: Animalia
- Phylum: Arthropoda
- Clade: Pancrustacea
- Class: Insecta
- Order: Mantodea
- Family: Amorphoscelidae
- Subfamily: Amorphoscelinae
- Genus: Maculatoscelis; Roy, 1973

Genus of mantises

Maculatoscelis is a genus of mantises belonging to the family Amorphoscelidae.

The species of this genus are found in Africa.

Species:

- Maculatoscelis ascalaphoides Bolivar, 1908
- Maculatoscelis gilloni Roy, 1964
- Maculatoscelis maculata (Roy, 1965)
