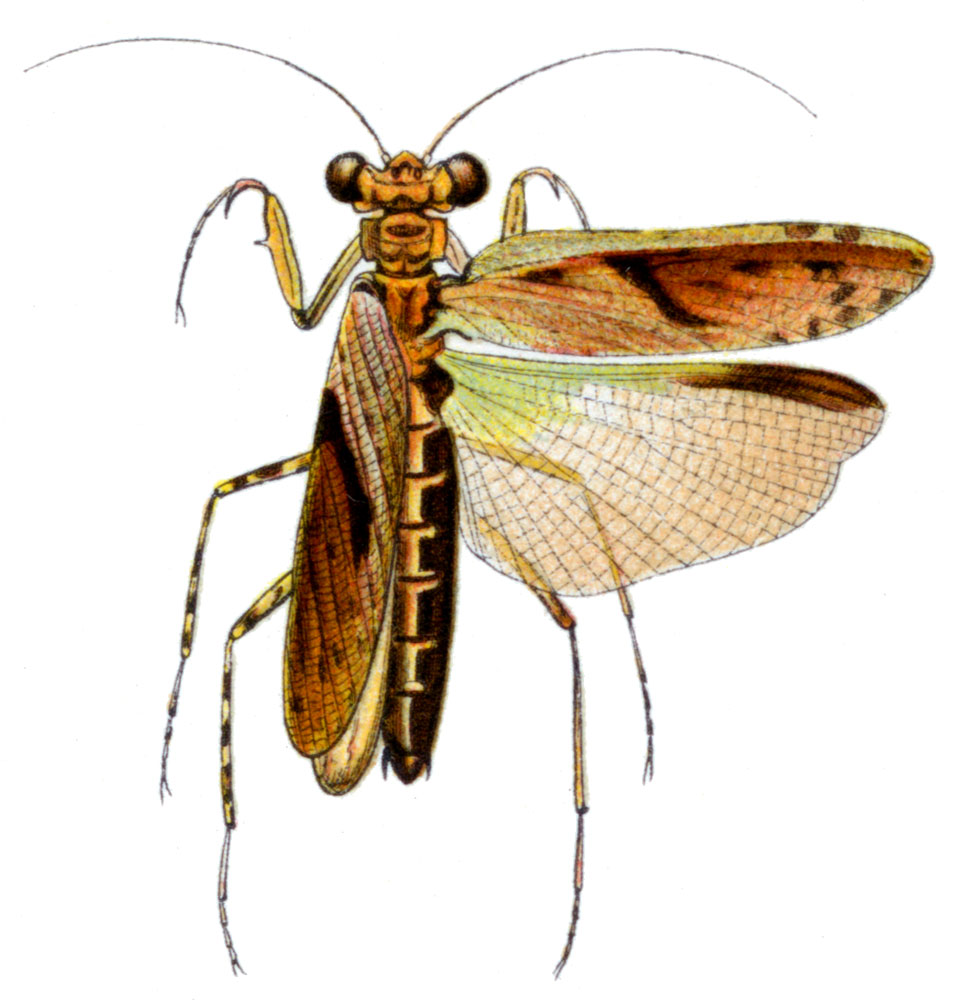

Scientific classification
- Kingdom: Animalia
- Phylum: Arthropoda
- Clade: Pancrustacea
- Class: Insecta
- Order: Mantodea
- Family: Amorphoscelidae
- Genus: Amorphoscelis
- Species: A. elegans

Binomial name
- Amorphoscelis elegans Giglio-Tos, 1913

Synonyms
- Amorphoscelis monodonta Roy, 1963

= Amorphoscelis elegans =

Species of praying mantis

Amorphoscelis elegans, the elegant amorphoscelis, is a species of mantis found in Ghana, Guinea, Togo, and Equatorial Guinea (Bioko).
