= Bolivaroscelis =

Scientific classification
- Kingdom: Animalia
- Phylum: Arthropoda
- Clade: Pancrustacea
- Class: Insecta
- Order: Mantodea
- Family: Amorphoscelidae
- Subfamily: Amorphoscelinae
- Genus: Bolivaroscelis; Roy, 1973

Genus of praying mantises

Bolivaroscelis is a genus of praying mantis in the family Amorphoscelidae.

== Species ==
The following species are recognised in the genus Bolivaroscelis:

- Bolivaroscelis bolivarii (Giglio-Tos, 1913)
- Bolivaroscelis carinata (Bolivar, 1908)
- Bolivaroscelis werneri Roy, 1962

== See also ==
- List of mantis genera and species
