= Creobroter nebulosa =

Scientific classification
- Kingdom: Animalia
- Phylum: Arthropoda
- Clade: Pancrustacea
- Class: Insecta
- Order: Mantodea
- Family: Hymenopodidae
- Genus: Creobroter
- Species: C. nebulosa

Binomial name
- Creobroter nebulosa Zheng, 1988

Species of praying mantis

Creobroter nebulosa is a species of praying mantis in the family Hymenopodidae.

== See also ==
- List of mantis genera and species
