= Amorphoscelis spinosa =

Scientific classification
- Kingdom: Animalia
- Phylum: Arthropoda
- Clade: Pancrustacea
- Class: Insecta
- Order: Mantodea
- Family: Amorphoscelidae
- Genus: Amorphoscelis
- Species: A. spinosa

Binomial name
- Amorphoscelis spinosa Beier, 1942

Species of praying mantis

Amorphoscelis spinosa is a species of praying mantis found in Sri Lanka.

== See also ==
- List of mantis genera and species
