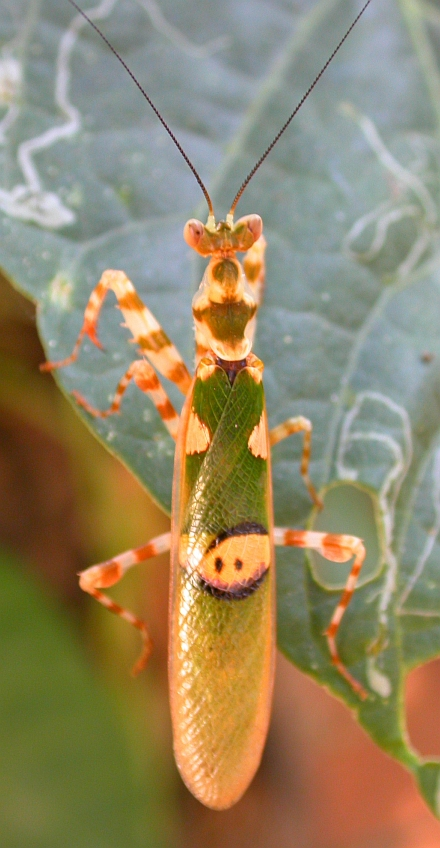
- Male Creobroter gemmatus

Scientific classification
- Kingdom: Animalia
- Phylum: Arthropoda
- Clade: Pancrustacea
- Class: Insecta
- Order: Mantodea
- Family: Hymenopodidae
- Genus: Creobroter
- Species: C. gemmatus

Binomial name
- Creobroter gemmatus Saussure, 1869

= Creobroter gemmatus =

Species of praying mantis

Creobroter gemmatus, common name jeweled flower mantis, is a species of praying mantis native to Asia.

== Description ==
Males grow to about 1.5 inches (3.8 cm) and females are slightly larger. They prefer a humid environment and live about nine months in captivity. Females can be cannibalistic but males are fairly communal. Though infrequent, cannibalism among C. germmatus is nevertheless more common than among other flower mantises.

They moult 8 times to become an adult and can take between 2 and 5 months to mature depending on food and temperature. They are the smallest yet most widespread Creobroter species.

Each ootheca can contain up to 50 eggs, and under optimal conditions, the hatchlings will emerge after about 5 weeks.

== See also ==
- Flower Mantis
- List of mantis genera and species
