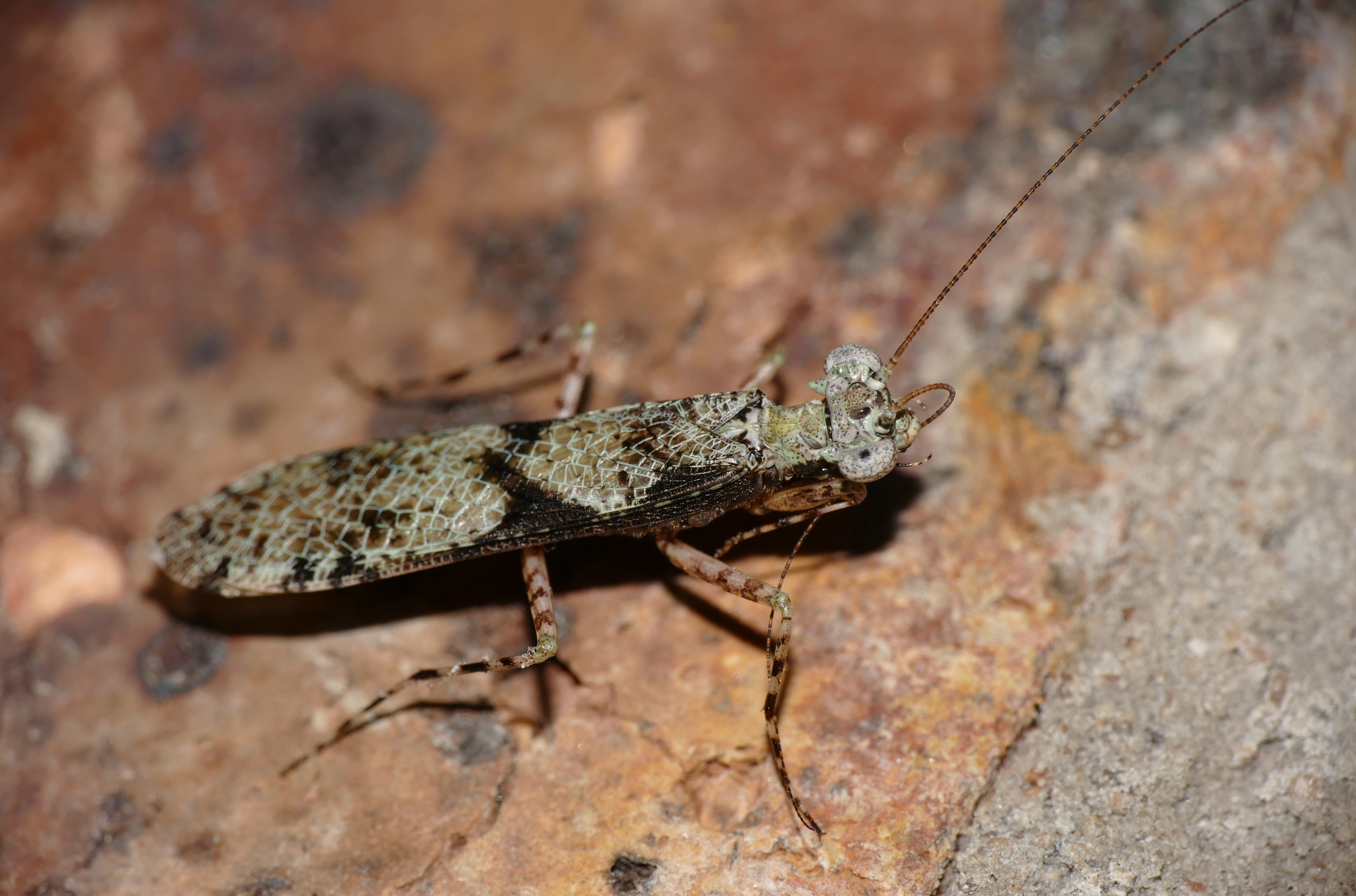
- Amorphoscelis tuberculata
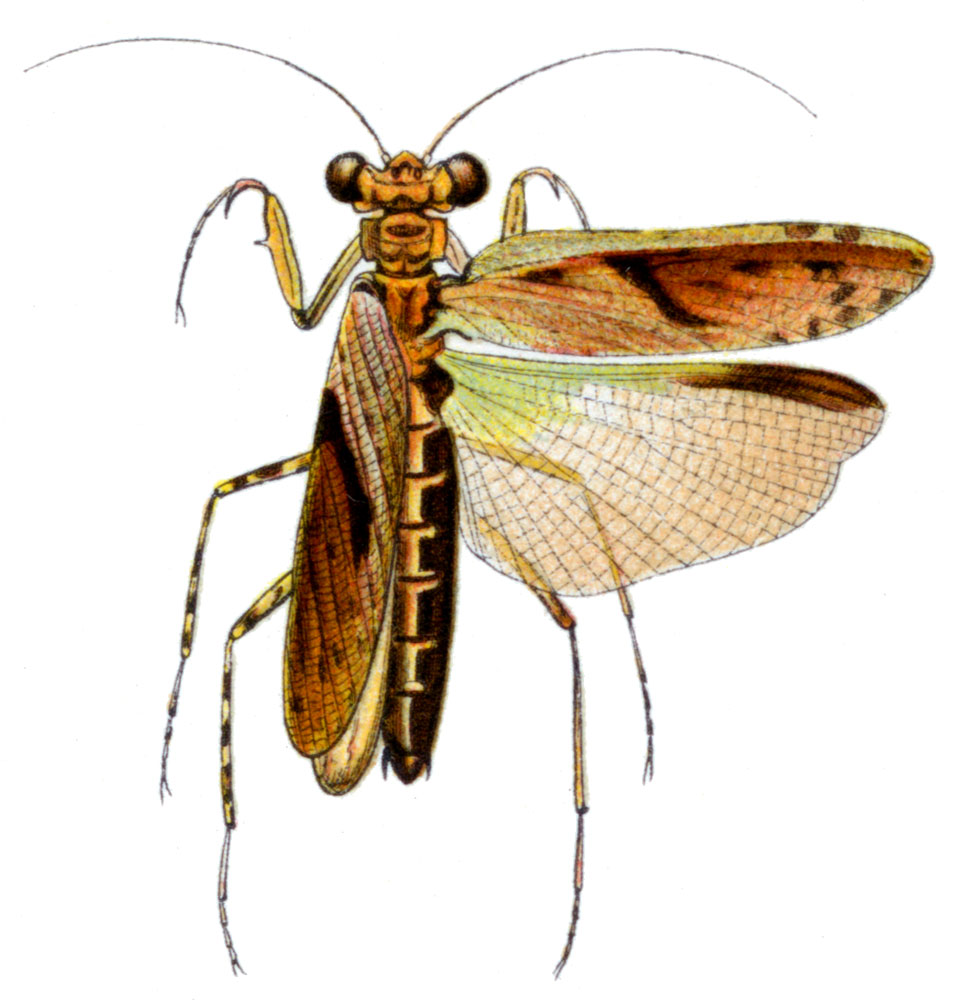
- Amorphoscelis elegans

Scientific classification
- Kingdom: Animalia
- Phylum: Arthropoda
- Clade: Pancrustacea
- Class: Insecta
- Order: Mantodea
- Family: Amorphoscelidae
- Subfamily: Amorphoscelinae
- Genus: Amorphoscelis; Stal, 1871

Species
- See text

= Amorphoscelis =

Genus of praying mantises

Amorphoscelis is a genus of praying mantis in the family Amorphoscelidae; records of occurrence are from Africa and tropical Asia.

== Species ==
The following species are recognised in the genus Amorphoscelis:

- Amorphoscelis abyssinica
- Amorphoscelis angolica
- Amorphoscelis annulicornis
- Amorphoscelis asymmetrica
- Amorphoscelis austrogermanica
- Amorphoscelis bimaculata
- Amorphoscelis borneana
- Amorphoscelis brunneipennis
- Amorphoscelis chinensis
- Amorphoscelis chopardi
- Amorphoscelis elegans
- Amorphoscelis griffini
- Amorphoscelis grisea
- Amorphoscelis hainana
- Amorphoscelis hamata
- Amorphoscelis huismani
- Amorphoscelis javana
- Amorphoscelis kenyensis
- Amorphoscelis lamottei
- Amorphoscelis laxeretis
- Amorphoscelis machadoi
- Amorphoscelis morini
- Amorphoscelis naumanni
- Amorphoscelis nigriventer
- Amorphoscelis nubeculosa
- Amorphoscelis opaca
- Amorphoscelis orientalis
- Amorphoscelis pallida
- Amorphoscelis pantherina
- Amorphoscelis papua
- Amorphoscelis parva
- Amorphoscelis pellucida
- Amorphoscelis phaesoma
- Amorphoscelis philippina
- Amorphoscelis pinheyi
- Amorphoscelis pulchella
- Amorphoscelis pulchra
- Amorphoscelis punctata
- Amorphoscelis reticulata
- Amorphoscelis rufula
- Amorphoscelis siebersi
- Amorphoscelis singaporana
- Amorphoscelis spinosa
- Amorphoscelis stellulatha
- Amorphoscelis subnigra
- Amorphoscelis sulawesiana
- Amorphoscelis sumatrana
- Amorphoscelis tigrina
- Amorphoscelis tuberculata
- Amorphoscelis villiersi
