= Creobroter medanus =

Scientific classification
- Kingdom: Animalia
- Phylum: Arthropoda
- Clade: Pancrustacea
- Class: Insecta
- Order: Mantodea
- Family: Hymenopodidae
- Genus: Creobroter
- Species: C. medanus

Binomial name
- Creobroter medanus Giglio-Tos, 1915

Species of praying mantis

Creobroter medanus is a species of praying mantis in the family Hymenopodidae.

== See also ==
- List of mantis genera and species
