= Caudatoscelis =

Scientific classification
- Kingdom: Animalia
- Phylum: Arthropoda
- Clade: Pancrustacea
- Class: Insecta
- Order: Mantodea
- Family: Amorphoscelidae
- Subfamily: Amorphoscelinae
- Genus: Caudatoscelis; Roy, 1973

Genus of praying mantises

Caudatoscelis is a genus of mantis in the family Amorphoscelididae; species are found in West Africa.

== Species ==
The following species are recognised in the genus Caudatoscelis:

- Caudatoscelis annulipes Karsch, 1892;
- Caudatoscelis caudata (Giglio-Tos, 1914) - type species;
- Caudatoscelis collarti Roy, 1964;
- Caudatoscelis lagrecai Roy, 1964;
- Caudatoscelis marmorata Roy, 1965.

== See also ==
- List of mantis genera and species
