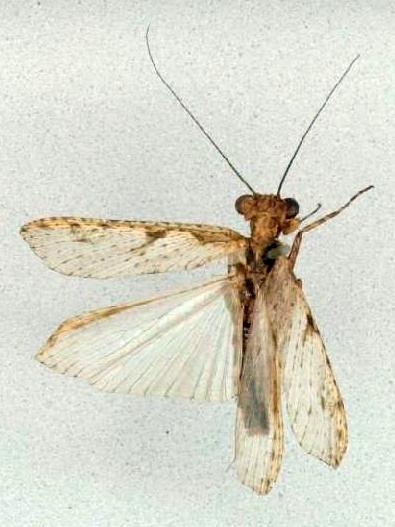
- Amorphoscelis annulicornis

Scientific classification
- Kingdom: Animalia
- Phylum: Arthropoda
- Clade: Pancrustacea
- Class: Insecta
- Order: Mantodea
- Family: Amorphoscelidae
- Genus: Amorphoscelis
- Species: A. annulicornis

Binomial name
- Amorphoscelis annulicornis Stål, 1871

Synonyms
- Amorphoscelis indica Giglio-Tos, 1915; Amorphoscelis keiseri Beier, 1956

= Amorphoscelis annulicornis =

Species of praying mantis

Amorphoscelis annulicornis is a species of praying mantis found in Sri Lanka, India, Nepal, and Malaysia.

== See also ==
- List of mantis genera and species
