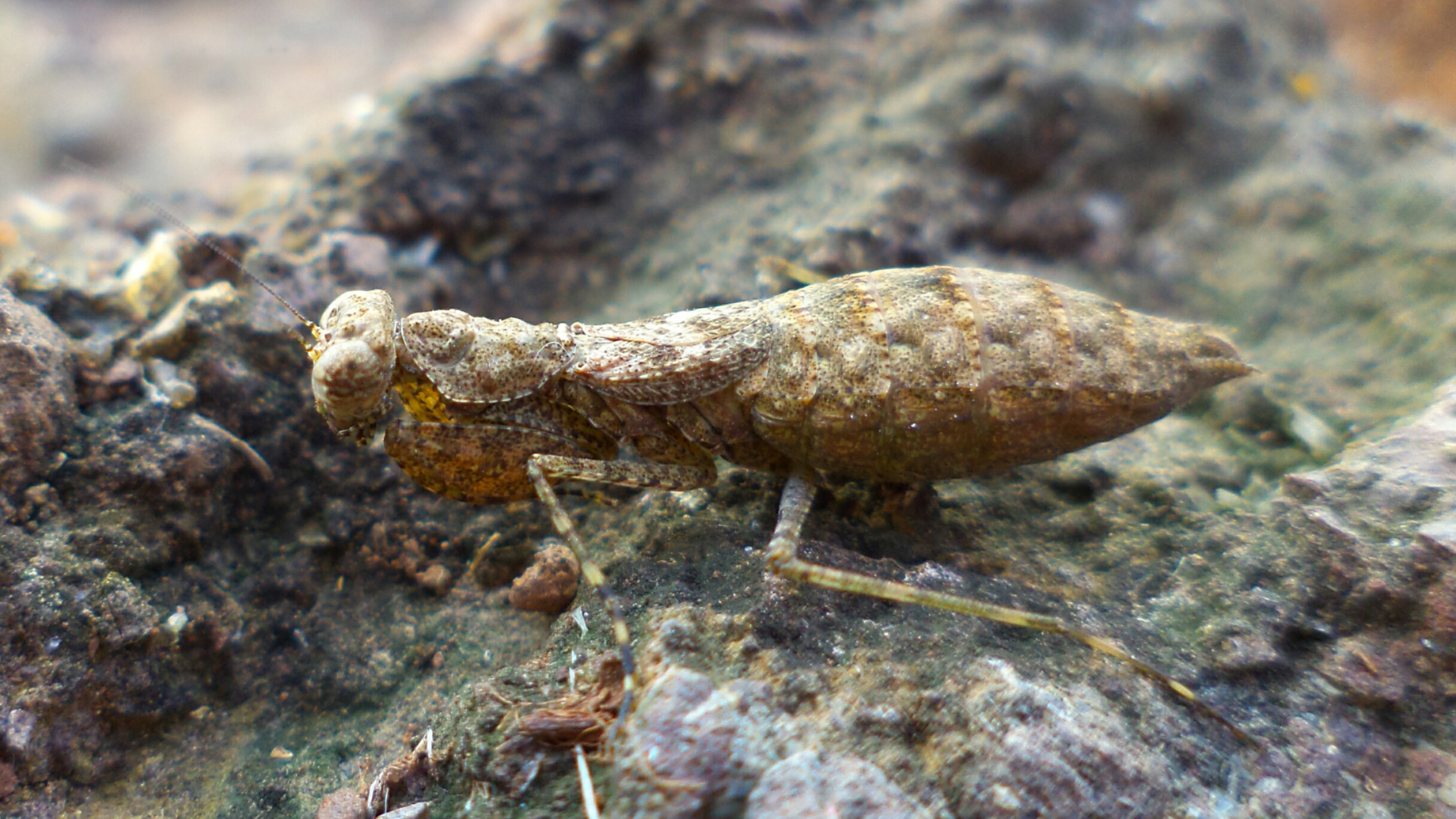
- Humbertiella ceylonica

Scientific classification
- Kingdom: Animalia
- Phylum: Arthropoda
- Clade: Pancrustacea
- Class: Insecta
- Order: Mantodea
- Family: Gonypetidae
- Subfamily: Gonypetinae
- Genus: Humbertiella; Saussure, 1869

Synonyms
- Theopompula Giglio-Tos, 1917

= Humbertiella =

Genus of praying mantises

Humbertiella is a genus of praying mantids in the subfamily Gonypetinae found in Asia.

== Species ==
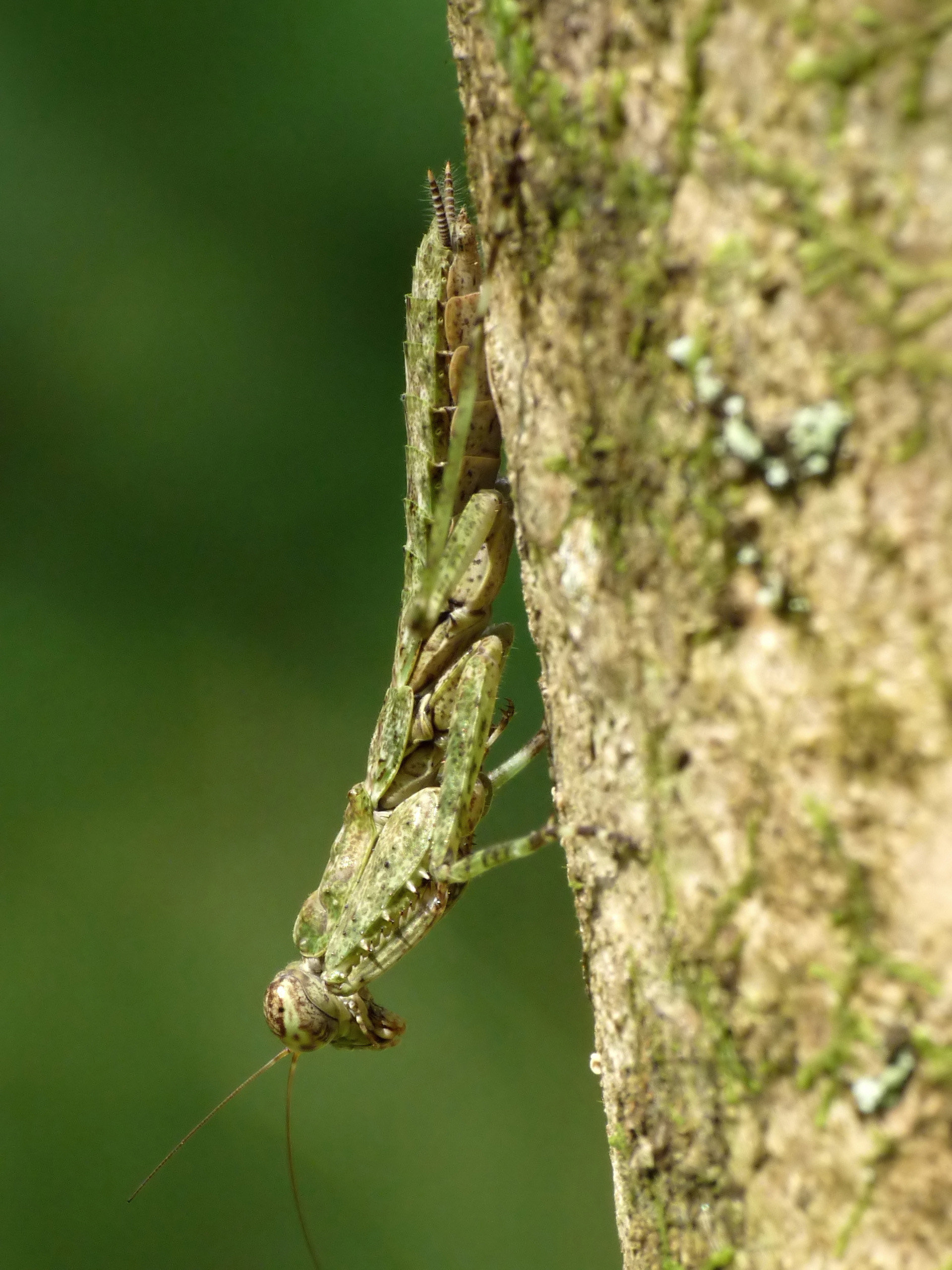
H. similis nymph (India)

The Mantodea Species File lists:

1. Humbertiella affinis Giglio-Tos, 1917
2. Humbertiella africana Rehn, 1912
3. Humbertiella assimilata Wood-Mason, 1891
4. Humbertiella brunneri Kirby, 1904
5. Humbertiella ceylonica Saussure, 1869 - type species
6. Humbertiella indica Saussure, 1869
7. Humbertiella laosana Beier, 1930
8. Humbertiella nada Zhang, 1986
9. Humbertiella nigrospinosa Sjostedt, 1930
10. Humbertiella ocularis Saussure, 1872
11. Humbertiella similis Giglio-Tos, 1917
12. Humbertiella sindhica Soomro, Soomro & Wagan, 2001
13. Humbertiella taprobanarum Wood-Mason, 1891
14. Humbertiella yunnanensis Wang & Bi, 1995
