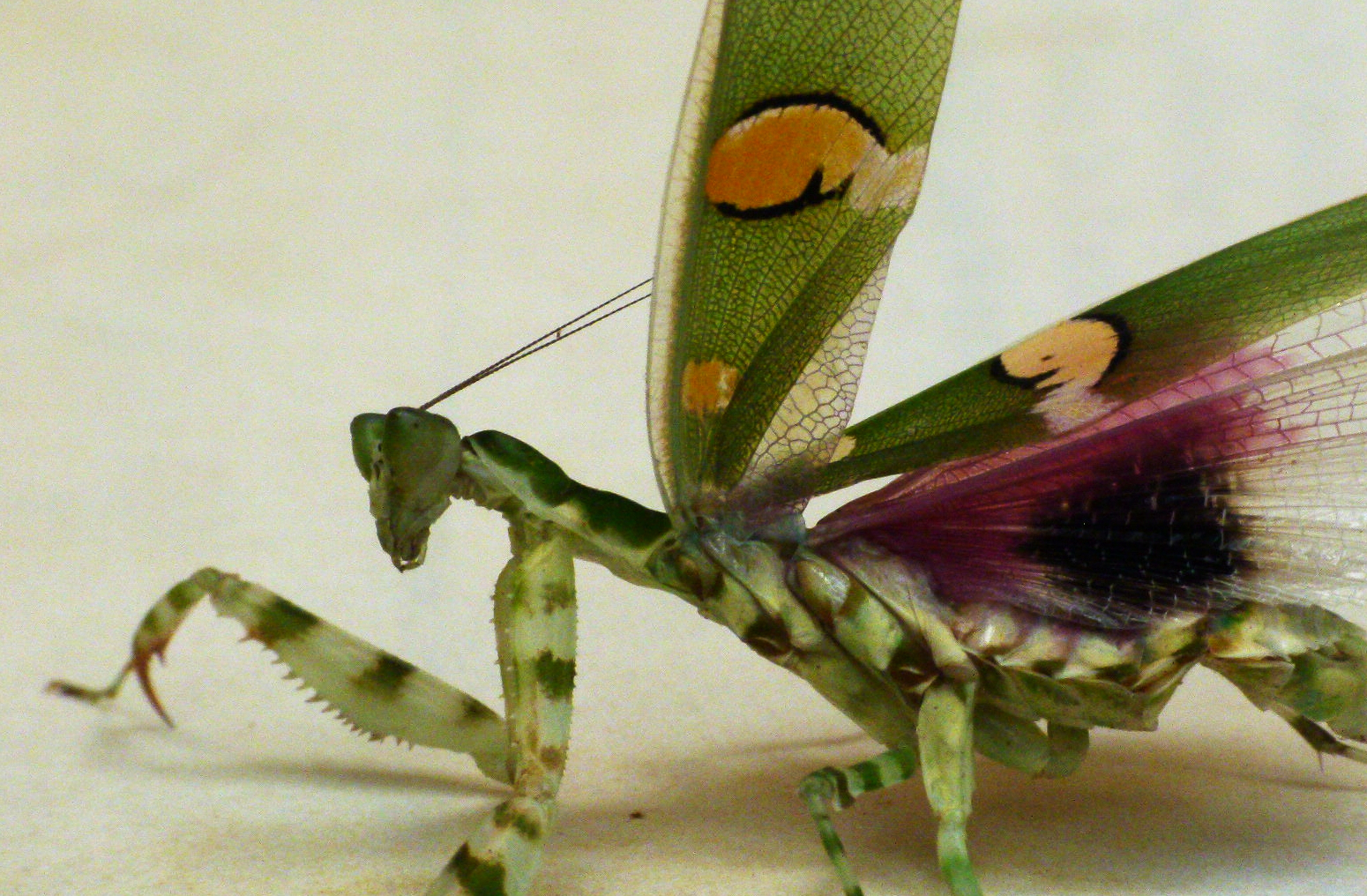

Scientific classification
- Kingdom: Animalia
- Phylum: Arthropoda
- Clade: Pancrustacea
- Class: Insecta
- Order: Mantodea
- Family: Hymenopodidae
- Subfamily: Hymenopodinae
- Tribe: Hymenopodini
- Genus: Creobroter
- Species: C. apicalis

Binomial name
- Creobroter apicalis Saussure, 1869

Synonyms
- Creobroter elongatus Beier, 1929

= Creobroter apicalis =

Species of praying mantis

Creobroter apicalis is an Asian species of praying mantids in the tribe Hymenopodini.
