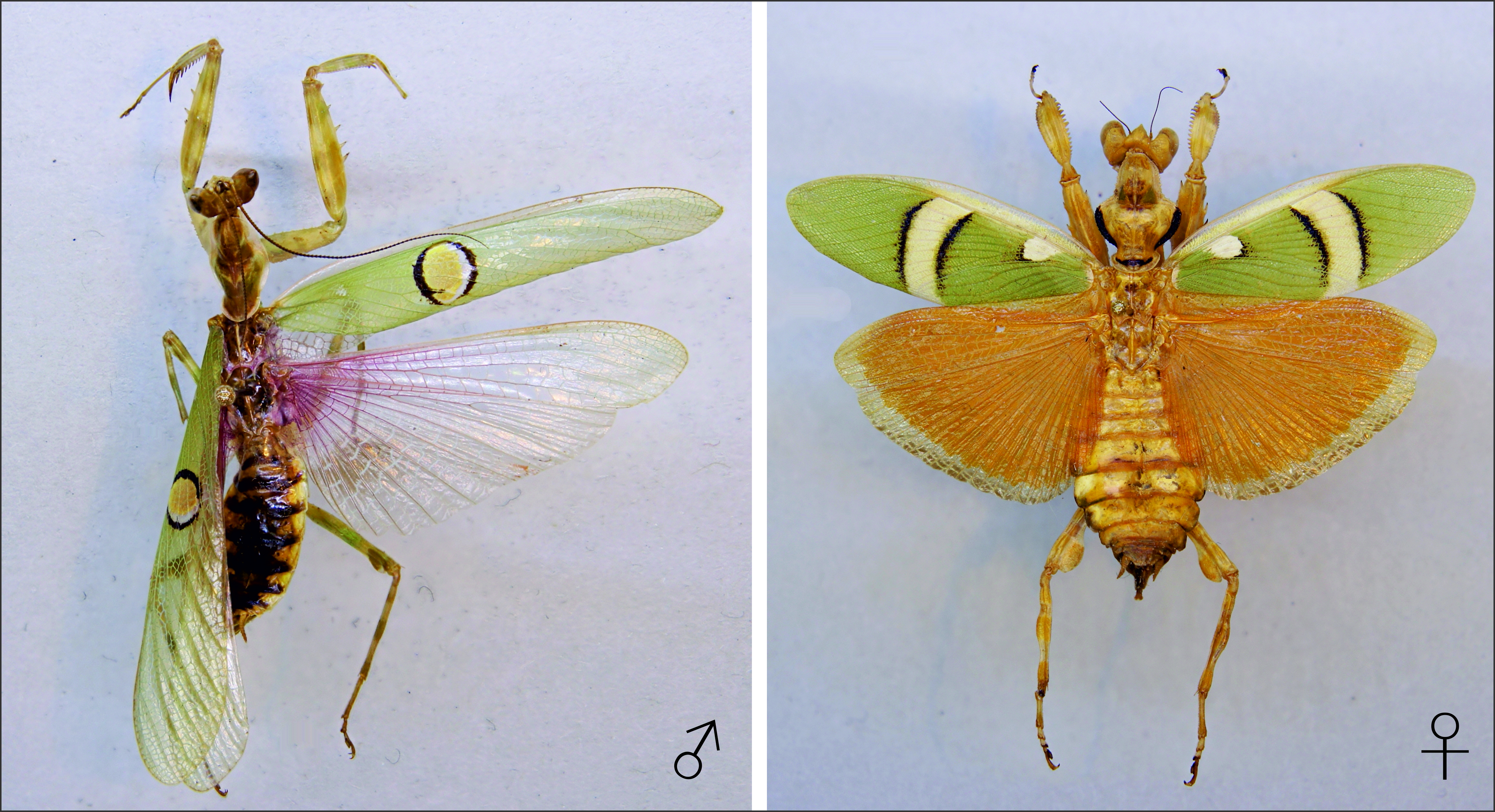
- Creobroter pictipennis (left animal only) at Zoologische Staatssammlung München

Scientific classification
- Kingdom: Animalia
- Phylum: Arthropoda
- Clade: Pancrustacea
- Class: Insecta
- Order: Mantodea
- Family: Hymenopodidae
- Genus: Creobroter
- Species: C. pictipennis

Binomial name
- Creobroter pictipennis Wood-Mason, 1878

= Creobroter pictipennis =

Species of praying mantis

Creobroter pictipennis, with the common name Indian flower mantis, is a species of praying mantis native to Asia.

Males grow to about 1.5 in long (3.8 cm) and females are slightly larger.

== See also ==
- List of mantis genera and species
