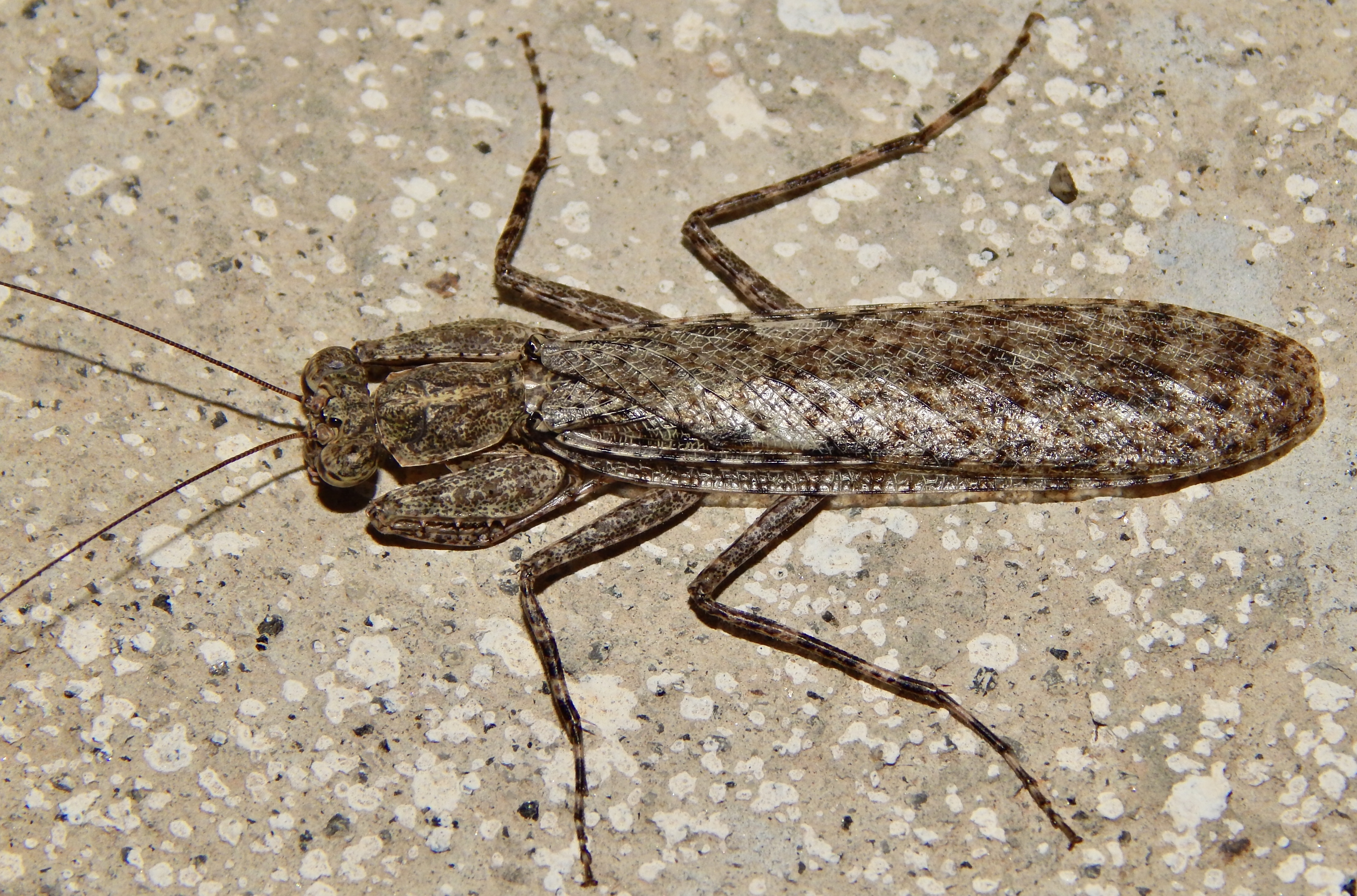

Scientific classification
- Kingdom: Animalia
- Phylum: Arthropoda
- Class: Insecta
- Order: Mantodea
- Family: Gonypetidae
- Genus: Humbertiella
- Species: H. ceylonica

Binomial name
- Humbertiella ceylonica Saussure, 1869

= Humbertiella ceylonica =

Species of Mantodea

Humbertiella ceylonica is a species of Mantodea in the genus Humbertiella.

== Distribution ==
Found in India, Myanmar, Sri Lanka, Nepal.

== Description ==
It has black tipped long antero-ventral spines on the fore-femora. It is medium sized, with body length ranging from 27-35mm in males and females 35-45mm.
