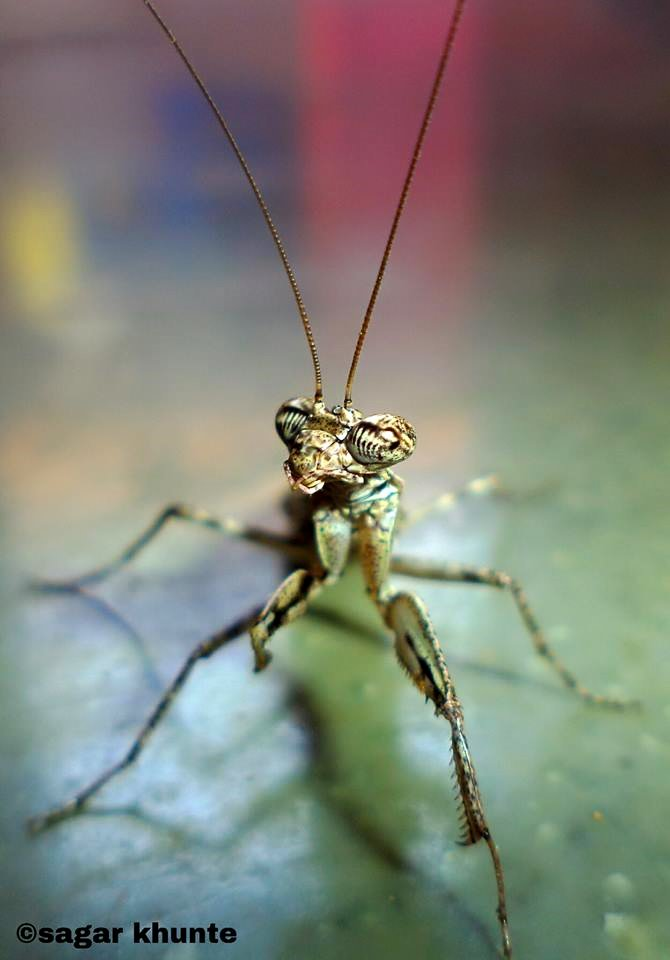

Scientific classification
- Kingdom: Animalia
- Phylum: Arthropoda
- Class: Insecta
- Order: Mantodea
- Family: Gonypetidae
- Genus: Humbertiella
- Species: H. similis

Binomial name
- Humbertiella similis Giglio-Tos, 1917

= Humbertiella similis =

Species of Mantodea

Humbertiella similis is a species of Mantodea in the genus Humbertiella.

== Description ==
It is small (3.7mm) and brown. Frontal sclerite has less arched superior edges. Its pronotum has less prominent protuberance. Black colour in fore femur internal spines at tips. Wings are smoky and longer than body.

== Distribution ==
It is found in Himachal Pradesh, Jammu and Kashmir, Kerala, Madhya Pradesh, Odisha, and Uttar Pradesh in India. Besides these they were also found in Nepal and Sri Lanka.
