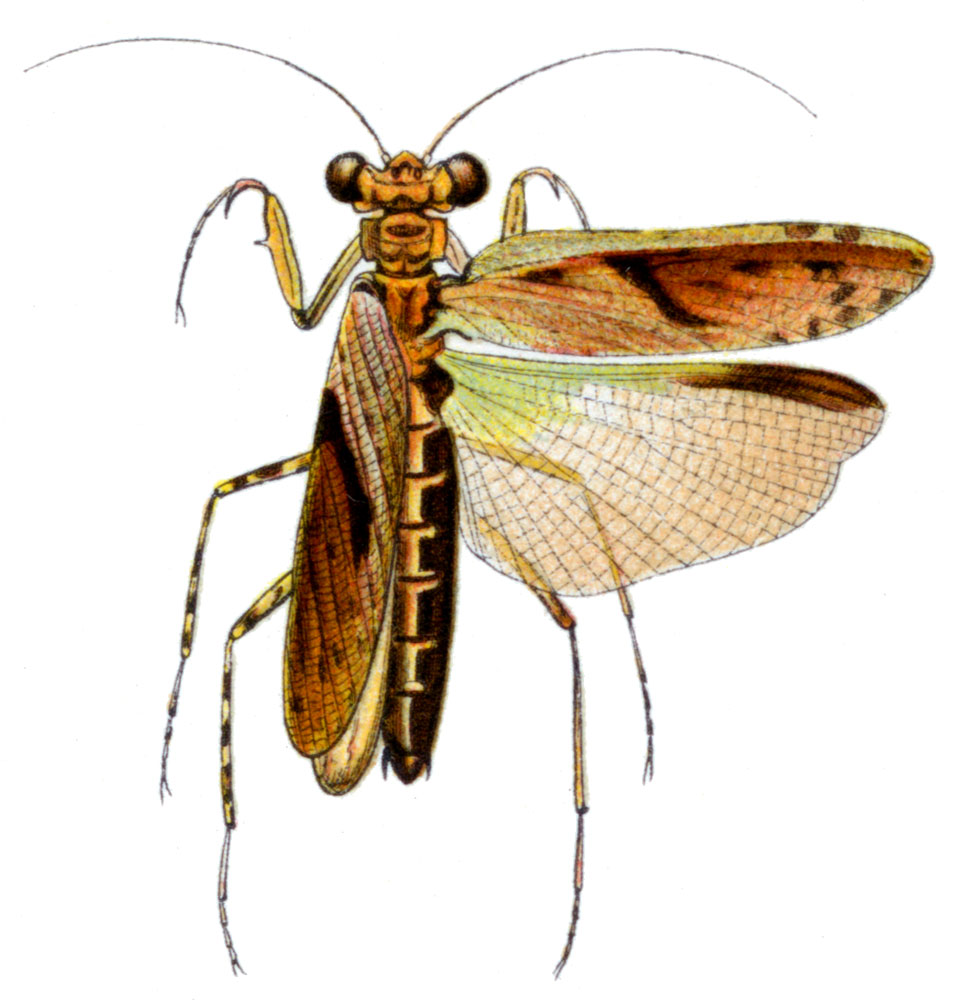
- Amorphoscelis elegans

Scientific classification
- Kingdom: Animalia
- Phylum: Arthropoda
- Clade: Pancrustacea
- Class: Insecta
- Order: Mantodea
- Superfamily: Nanomantodia
- Family: Amorphoscelidae; Stål, 1877

Subfamilies
- Amorphoscelinae; Perlamantinae

Synonyms
- Amorphoscelididae Stål, 1877

= Amorphoscelidae =

Family of praying mantises

Amorphoscelidae is a family of mantises in the order Mantodea.

== Subfamilies and Genera ==
There are eight genera in two subfamilies recognized in the family Amorphoscelidae:

=== Subfamily Amorphoscelinae ===
Distribution: Africa, Yemen, tropical Asia

- Amorphoscelis Stal, 1871
- †Amorphoscelites Gratshev & Zherikhin, 1994
- Bolivaroscelis Roy, 1973
- Caudatoscelis Roy, 1973
- Gigliotoscelis Roy, 1973
- Maculatoscelis Roy, 1973

=== Subfamily Perlamantinae ===
Distribution: Africa, Europe

- Paramorphoscelis Werner, 1907 - monotypic - P. gondokorensis Werner, 1907
- Perlamantis Guerin-Meneville, 1843

== See also ==
- List of mantis genera and species
