= Epaphroditinae =

Scientific classification
- Kingdom: Animalia
- Phylum: Arthropoda
- Clade: Pancrustacea
- Class: Insecta
- Order: Mantodea
- Family: Epaphroditidae
- Subfamily: Epaphroditinae; Brunner von Wattenwyl, 1893

Subfamily of praying mantises

Epaphroditinae is a subfamily of praying mantids in the Epaphroditidae: previously placed in the family Hymenopodidae and now containing two monotypic tribes. The type genus remains Epaphrodita (Serville, 1831).

== Tribes and Genera ==
tribe Callimantini

- Callimantis Stal, 1877 - monotypic (C. antillarum Saussure, 1859)

tribe Epaphroditini

- Epaphrodita Serville, 1831

now placed elsewhere

- Amphecostephanus (Rehn, 1912) is now placed in the Chroicopteridae: Chroicopterinae
- Parablepharis (Saussure, 1870) is now placed in the Hymenopodidae: Phyllothelyinae
- Phyllocrania (Burmeister, 1838) is now placed in the Hymenopodidae: Phyllocraniinae
