= Gonatista major =

Scientific classification
- Kingdom: Animalia
- Phylum: Arthropoda
- Clade: Pancrustacea
- Class: Insecta
- Order: Mantodea
- Family: Epaphroditidae
- Genus: Gonatista
- Species: G. major

Binomial name
- Gonatista major Caudell, 1912

Species of praying mantis

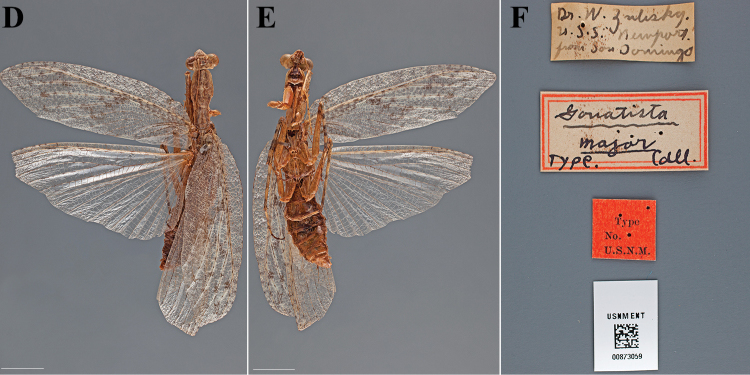

Gonatista major is a species of praying mantis native to the Caribbean and is found in Puerto Rico, Hispaniola, and perhaps elsewhere. In comparing G. grisea and G. reticulata in 2008, an entomologist with the United States Department of Agriculture wrote:

In general color this species is lighter than either of the preceding ones and is decidedly larger than either of them. The infuscation of the elytra is no more profuse than in grisea but is gathered in decidedly larger blotches, in this respect more like reticulata. The female is unknown to me. The measurements of the males are as follows: Length, pronotum, 13.5-14.5 mm.; elytra, 45-48 mm.

— Notes on the Mantid genus Gonatista Sauss. Bureau of Entomology, U. S. Dept. of Agriculture, Washington, D. C.

== See also ==
- List of mantis genera and species
