= Epaphrodita lobivertex =

Scientific classification
- Kingdom: Animalia
- Phylum: Arthropoda
- Clade: Pancrustacea
- Class: Insecta
- Order: Mantodea
- Family: Epaphroditidae
- Genus: Epaphrodita
- Species: E. lobivertex

Binomial name
- Epaphrodita lobivertex Lombardo & Perez-Gelabert, 2004

Species of praying mantis

Epaphrodita lobivertex is a species of praying mantis, native to Hispaniola, that was first described in 2004.
