= Gonatista phryganoides =

Scientific classification
- Kingdom: Animalia
- Phylum: Arthropoda
- Clade: Pancrustacea
- Class: Insecta
- Order: Mantodea
- Family: Epaphroditidae
- Genus: Gonatista
- Species: G. phryganoides

Binomial name
- Gonatista phryganoides Serville, 1839

Species of praying mantis

Gonatista phryganoides is a species of praying mantis discovered in 1839. According to an entomologist's account published in 1912:

This is the smallest member of the genus and is represented in the collection of the U. S. National Museum by a series of six males from San Francisco Mts., San Dorningo, W. I., taken in September,1905, by August Busck. Besides being much smaller than any other known species of the genus this differs from all others in the maculation of the elytra, which is here composed almost or entirely of small dots, no large elongate splotches being present as in the larger forms. I have seen no females of this species. The measurements of the males studied are as follows: Length, pronotum, 7.5–9 mm.; elytra, 26–28 mm.

— Bureau of Entomology, Notes on the mantid genus Gonatista (SAUSS). U.S. Dept of Agriculture, Washington, DC

== See also ==
- List of mantis species and genera
