= A. rex =

A. rex may refer to:

- Amphecostephanus rex, a praying mantis species found in Angola and Malawi
- Anatalavis rex, a prehistoric bird species from the Late Cretaceous or Early Paleocene of New Jersey
- Aralia rex, a plant species related to spikenard

== See also ==
- Rex (disambiguation)
