= Gonatista jaiba =

Scientific classification
- Domain: Eukaryota
- Kingdom: Animalia
- Phylum: Arthropoda
- Class: Insecta
- Order: Mantodea
- Family: Epaphroditidae
- Genus: Gonatista
- Species: G. jaiba

Binomial name
- Gonatista jaiba Lombardo & Perez-Gelabert 2004

Species of praying mantis

Gonatista jaiba is a species of praying mantis living in Hispaniola that was first described in 2004.

== See also ==
- List of mantis genera and species
