= Gonatista reticulata =

Scientific classification
- Kingdom: Animalia
- Phylum: Arthropoda
- Clade: Pancrustacea
- Class: Insecta
- Order: Mantodea
- Family: Epaphroditidae
- Genus: Gonatista
- Species: G. reticulata

Binomial name
- Gonatista reticulata Thunberg, 1815

Synonyms
- Gonatista bifasciata de Haan, 1842; Gonatista cubensis Saussure, 1869

Species of praying mantis

Gonatista reticulata is a species of praying mantis from the Caribbean. It is known from Saint Barthélemy, the Dominican Republic, and Puerto Rico.

== Description ==
According to Andrew Nelson Caudell (1912):

This species is represented in the collection of the National Museum by two males from (Puerto Rico). It is closest to grisea but the two specimens before me are lighter in color and the infuscation of the elytra is more profuse, covering about one half the total area. It is also a little larger. I place [Gonatista] bifasciata Haan and [Gonatista] cubensis Saussure as synonyms of this form. The measurements of the two males studied by me are as follows: Length, pronotum, 11–12 mm.; elytra, 36–40 mm.

== See also ==
- List of mantis genera and species
