= Achlaena grandis =

Scientific classification
- Kingdom: Animalia
- Phylum: Arthropoda
- Clade: Pancrustacea
- Class: Insecta
- Order: Mantodea
- Family: Chroicopteridae
- Subfamily: Chroicopterinae
- Tribe: Chroicopterini
- Subtribe: Dystactina
- Genus: Achlaena; Karsch, 1892
- Species: A. grandis

Binomial name
- Achlaena grandis (Westwood, 1889)

Synonyms
- Genus synonymy: Auchmomantis Werner, 1908; Species synonymy: Miopteryx grandis Westwood, 1889; Achlaena chrysichroma Karsch, 1892; Auchmomantis rhodii Werner, 1908; Achlaena mutica Giglio-Tos, 1915

Genus of mantises

Achlaena is a genus of mantises belonging to the family Chroicopteridae, containing the single species Achlaena grandis from Central Africa.
