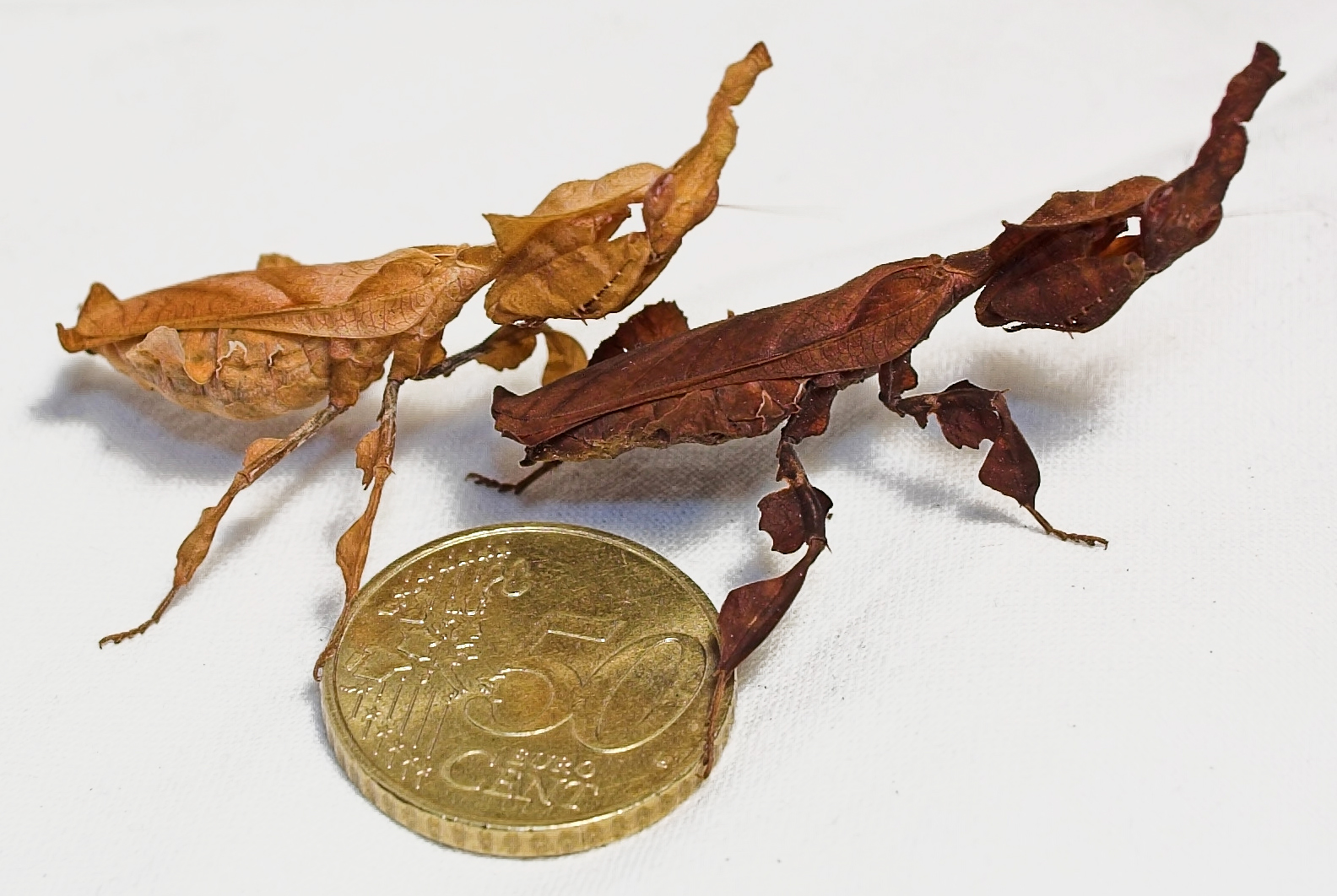
- Two adult female Ghost mantises with a 50-cent euro coin (diameter 24.25 mm) for size comparison

Scientific classification
- Kingdom: Animalia
- Phylum: Arthropoda
- Clade: Pancrustacea
- Class: Insecta
- Order: Mantodea
- Family: Hymenopodidae
- Tribe: Phyllocranini
- Genus: Phyllocrania; Burmeister, 1838

Species
- Phyllocrania illudens (Saussure & Zehntner, 1895); Phyllocrania insignis (Westwood, 1843); Phyllocrania paradoxa (Burmeister, 1838)

= Phyllocrania =

Genus of praying mantises

Phyllocrania is a genus of mantises in the family Hymenopodidae, commonly known as ghost mantises.

== Species ==
This genus contains three species:

- P. illudens (Saussure & Zehntner, 1895) — Madagascar ghost mantis, shadow mantis
- P. insignis (Westwood, 1843)
- P. paradoxa (Burmeister, 1838) — ghost mantis, common ghost mantis

== Gallery ==
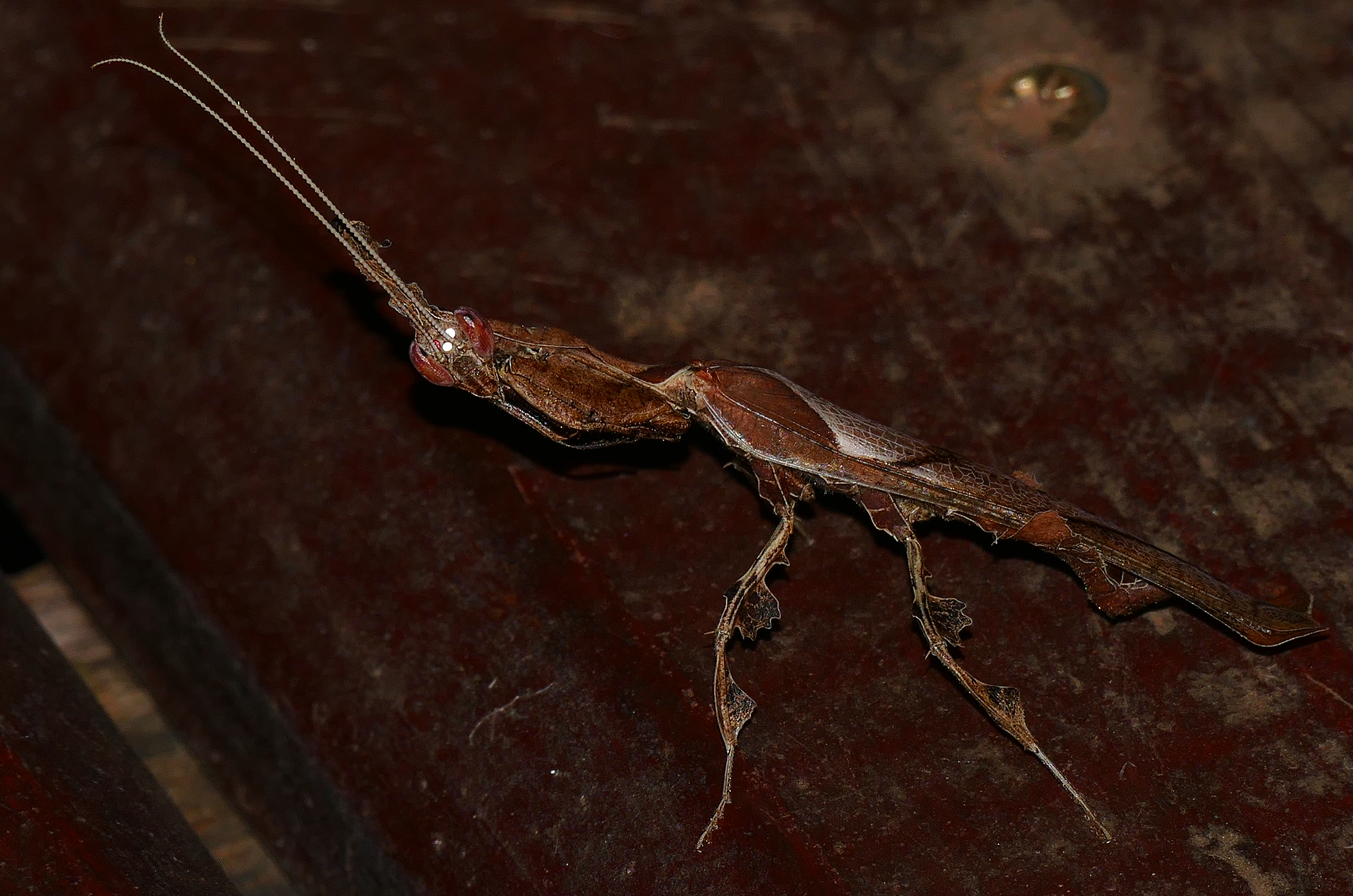
Phyllocrania paradoxa adult male

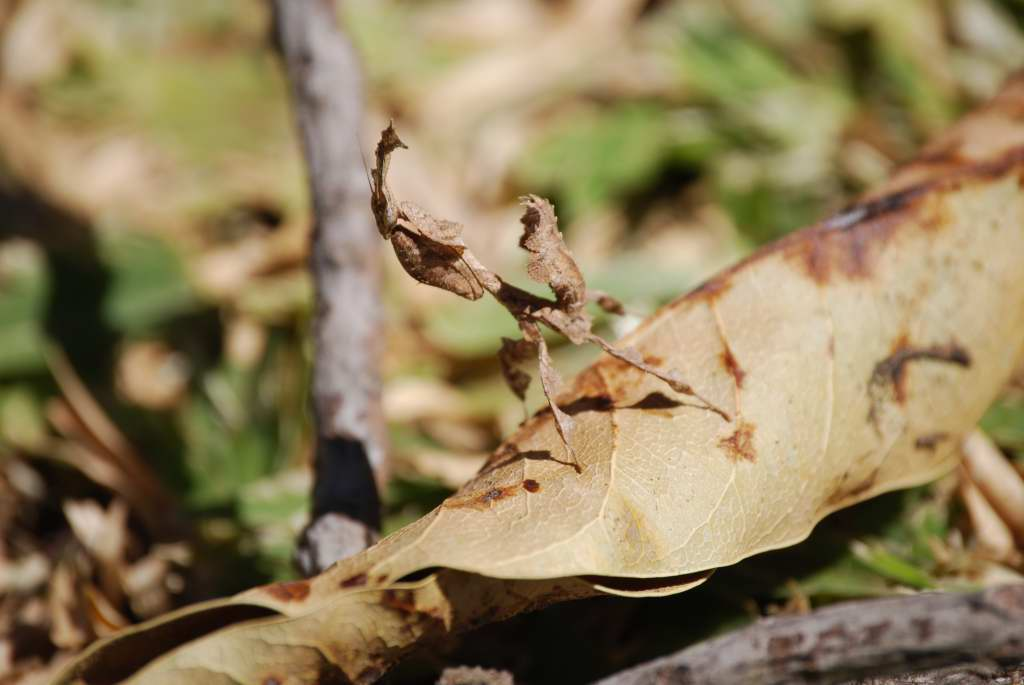
Nymph

== See also ==
- List of mantis genera and species
- Dead leaf mantis
- Parablepharis
- Phyllothelys
- Ceratocrania macra
