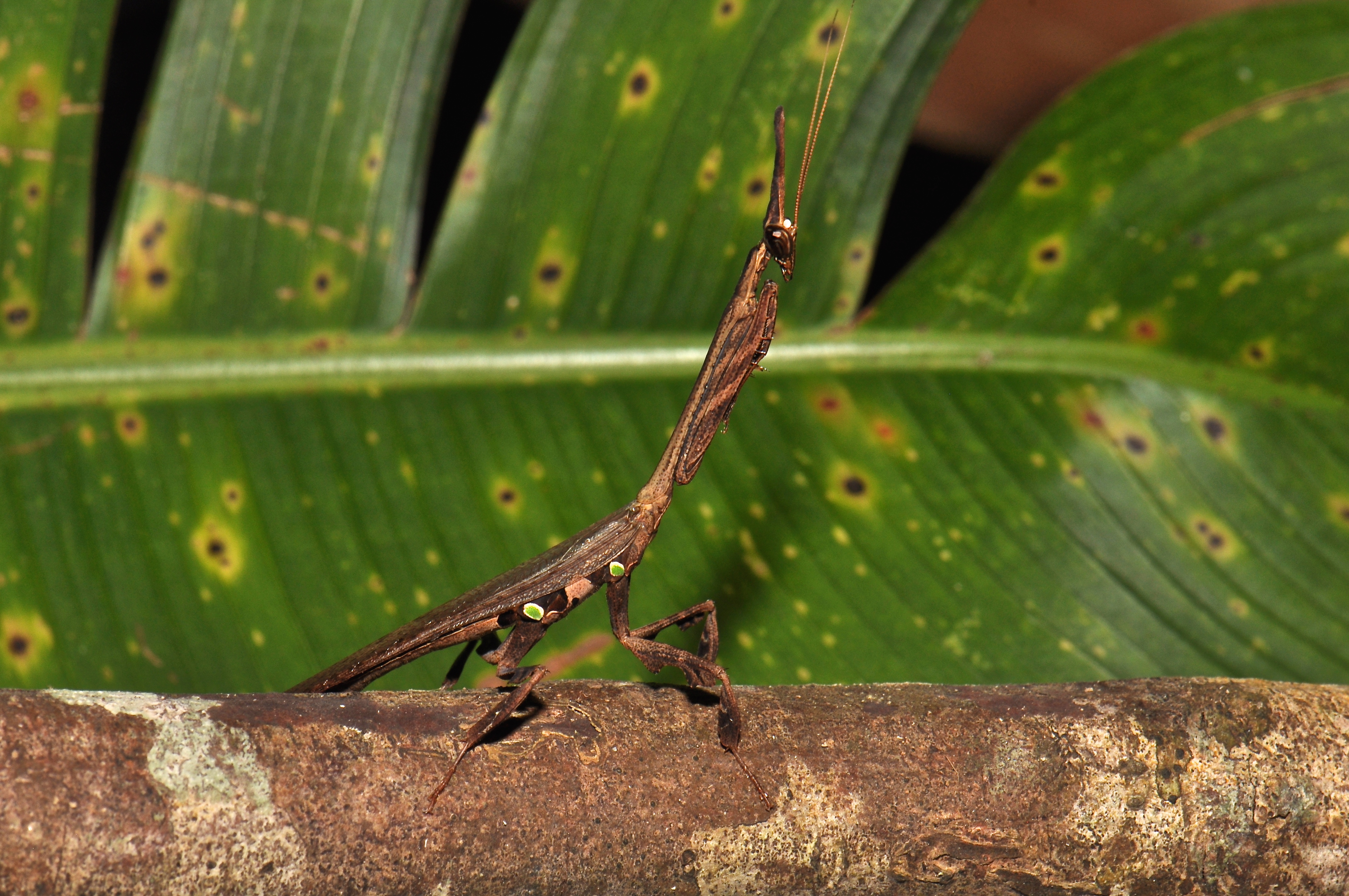
- Ceratocrania macra

Scientific classification
- Kingdom: Animalia
- Phylum: Arthropoda
- Clade: Pancrustacea
- Class: Insecta
- Order: Mantodea
- Family: Hymenopodidae
- Subfamily: Phyllothelyinae
- Tribe: Phyllothelyini
- Genus: Ceratocrania; Westwood, 1889

= Ceratocrania =

Species of praying mantis

Ceratocrania is a genus of praying mantises in the family Hymenopodidae. Species are recorded from Malesia.

== Species ==
The Mantodea Species File lists:

1. Ceratocrania macra Westwood, 1889 - type species
2. Ceratocrania malayae Wood-Mason, 1889
