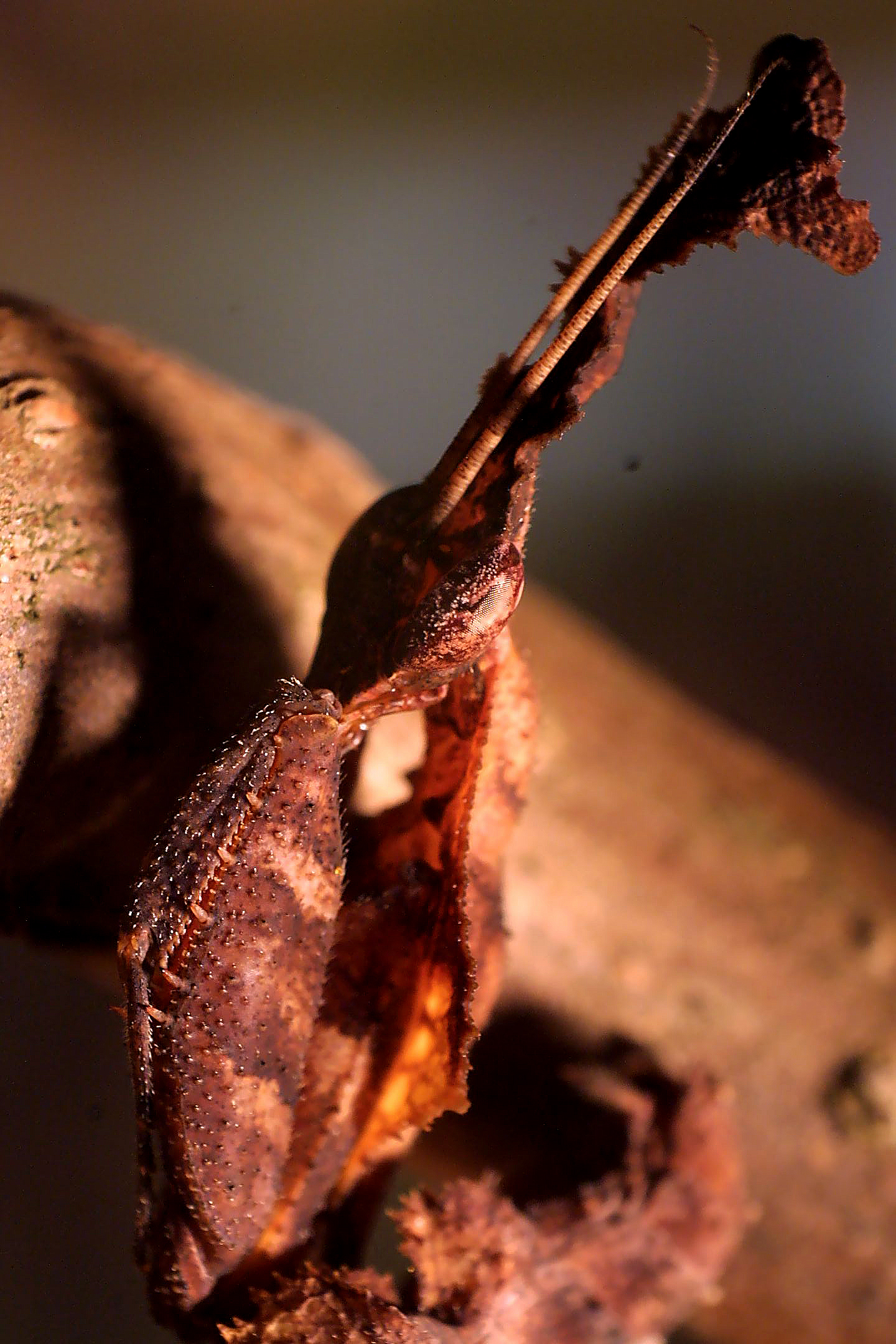
- Male ghost mantis in one of the older nymph stages, probably subadult

Scientific classification
- Kingdom: Animalia
- Phylum: Arthropoda
- Clade: Pancrustacea
- Class: Insecta
- Order: Mantodea
- Family: Hymenopodidae
- Genus: Phyllocrania
- Species: P. paradoxa

Binomial name
- Phyllocrania paradoxa (Burmeister, 1838)

= Phyllocrania paradoxa =

Species of praying mantis

Phyllocrania paradoxa, common name ghost mantis, is a small species of mantis from Africa remarkable for its leaf-like body. It is one of the three species in the genus Phyllocrania, known for its distinct and exclusive camouflaged appearance of a dry, weathered leaf.

== Description ==
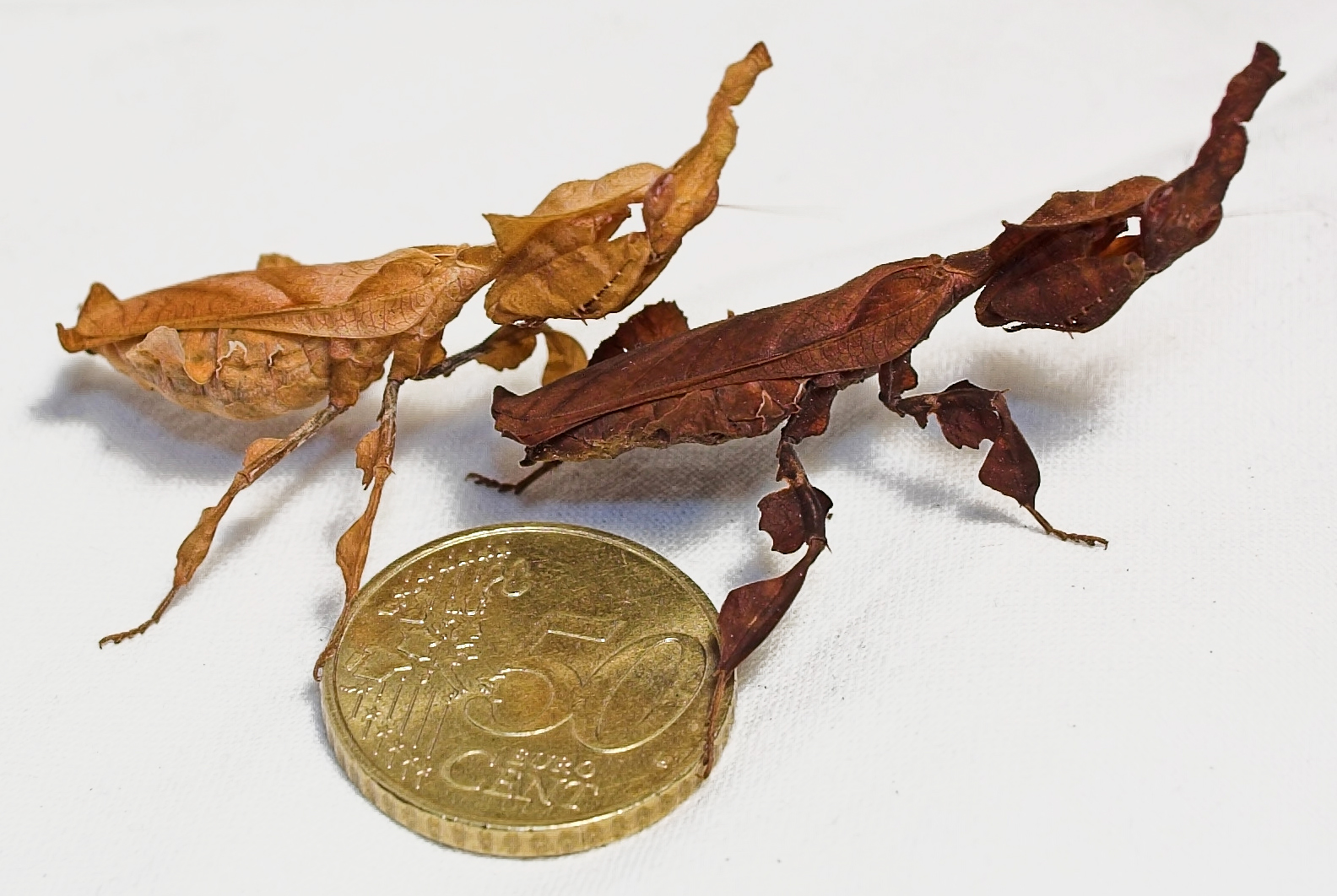
Two adult female ghost mantises with a 50-cent euro coin (diameter 24.25 mm) for size comparison

Compared to many other praying mantises, the ghost mantis is a "miniature species", growing to only about 45 to 50 mm (1.8 to 2.0 in) long.

It occurs in various brownish shades from very dark brown (almost black) to greenish gray. An individual's colors change between molts and are also dependent on light and humidity levels.

Phyllocrania paradoxa is camouflaged so as to appear as dead, dried-up leaf material. It has an elongated head, a flattened, extended prothorax, and leaf-like protrusions from its limbs. This mantis also has a forewing that looks like a desiccated leaf, and the "creases" in the wings are actually shadings of pigment. In the wild, the ghost praying mantis effectively blends in against dead leaves. Predators such as birds tend to overlook insects that resemble their background, and by staying still, the ghost praying mantis can go unnoticed.

If threatened, big nymphs and adult females adopt thanatosis, i.e. they play dead, whereas adult males run or fly away.

P. paradoxa oothecae can hatch out up to 36 young. First- and second-instar nymphs of this species are dark colored and use ant mimicry as a defense.

=== Sexual dimorphism ===
As with most or all species of mantises, P. paradoxa is sexually dimorphic, with females being larger than males. Females have six abdominal segments. Males are shorter, narrower, and have eight-segmented abdomens. At the fifth instar and above, males are thinner than females and have smaller appendages (lateral of the abdomen). At the sixth instar and above, their crowns are different. As adults, males have longer and thicker antennae than females and transparent wings, which are longer than the abdomen. They are good flyers and are significantly thinner than the females. At the fifth instar and above, females are more compact than males and have bigger appendages. At the sixth instar and above, the crowns of females are as wide as their heads and more linear and smoother than the male`s crown. As adults, females are significantly more compact than males, with shorter antennae and wings that do not cover their abdomens.

== Range ==
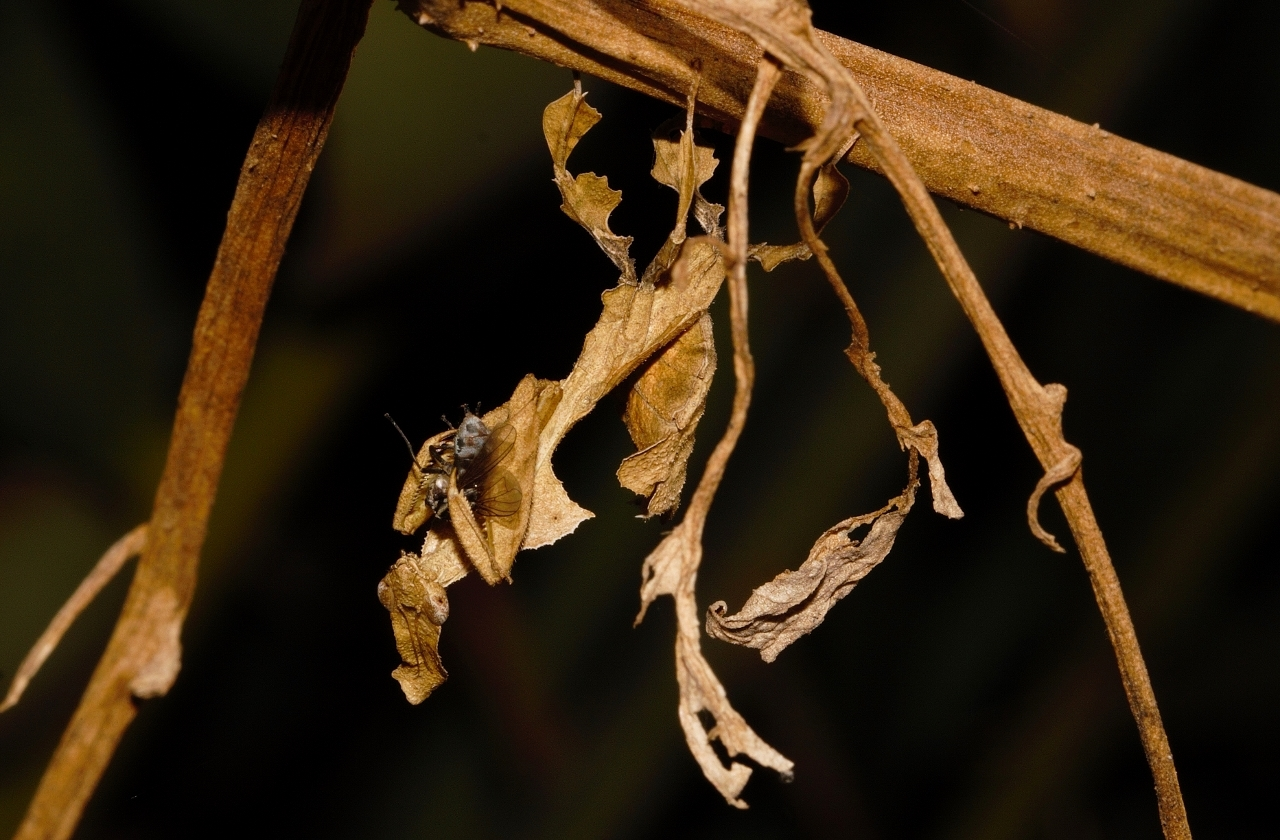
Eating a fly in Zimbabwe

P. paradoxa has a wide range across the African continent and its islands and can be found in Angola, Cameroon, Cape Province, Congo Basin, Ethiopia, Ghana, Guinea, Ivory Coast, Kenya, Malawi, Madagascar, Mozambique, Namibia, Somalia, South Africa, Sudan, Tanzania, Togo, Transvaal, Uganda, and Zimbabwe.

=== Habitat ===
Ghost mantises inhabit dry areas, bushes, shrubs, and trees in the open.

== Gallery ==
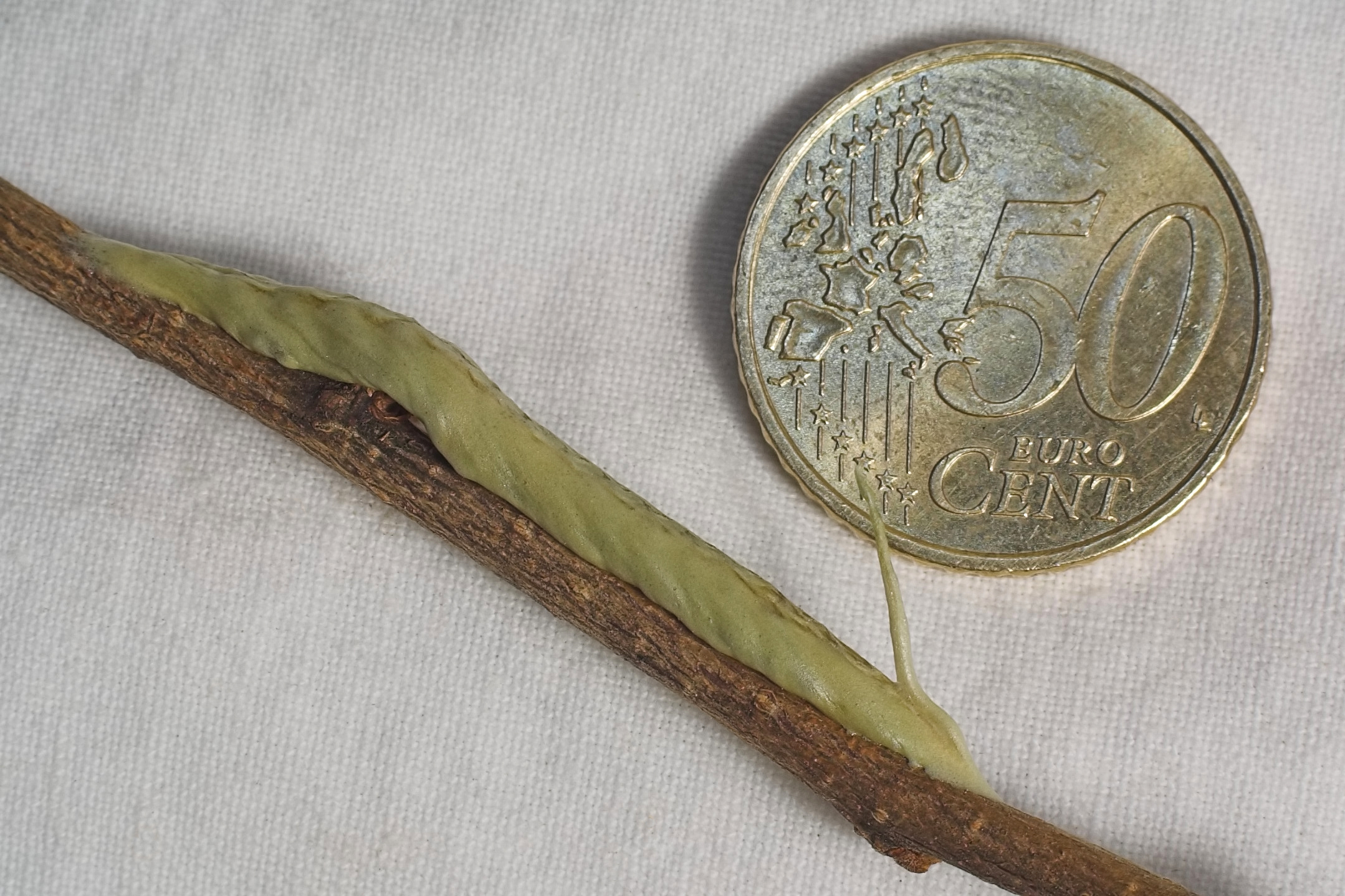
Ghost mantis ootheca

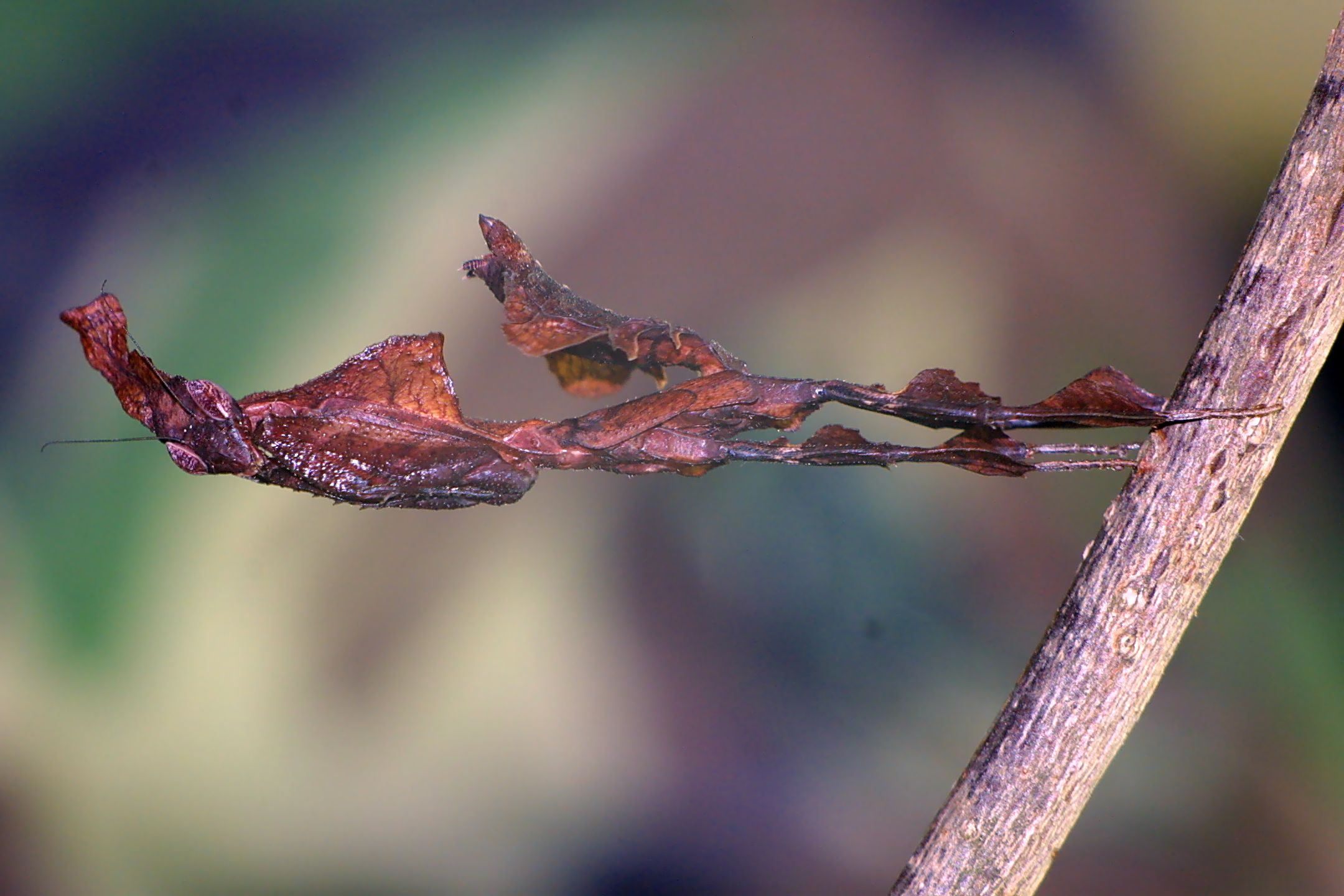
Subadult female ghost mantis

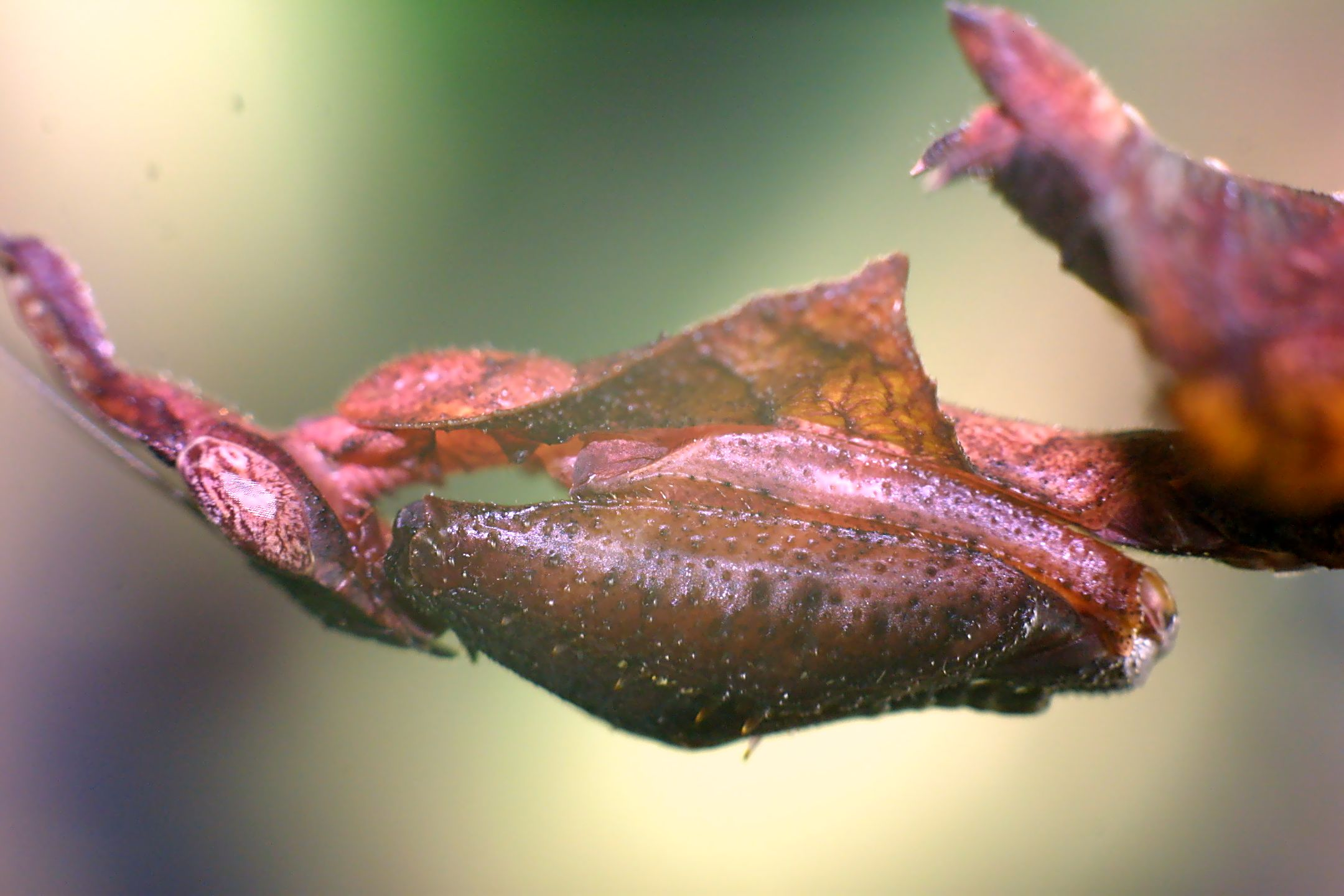
Subadult female

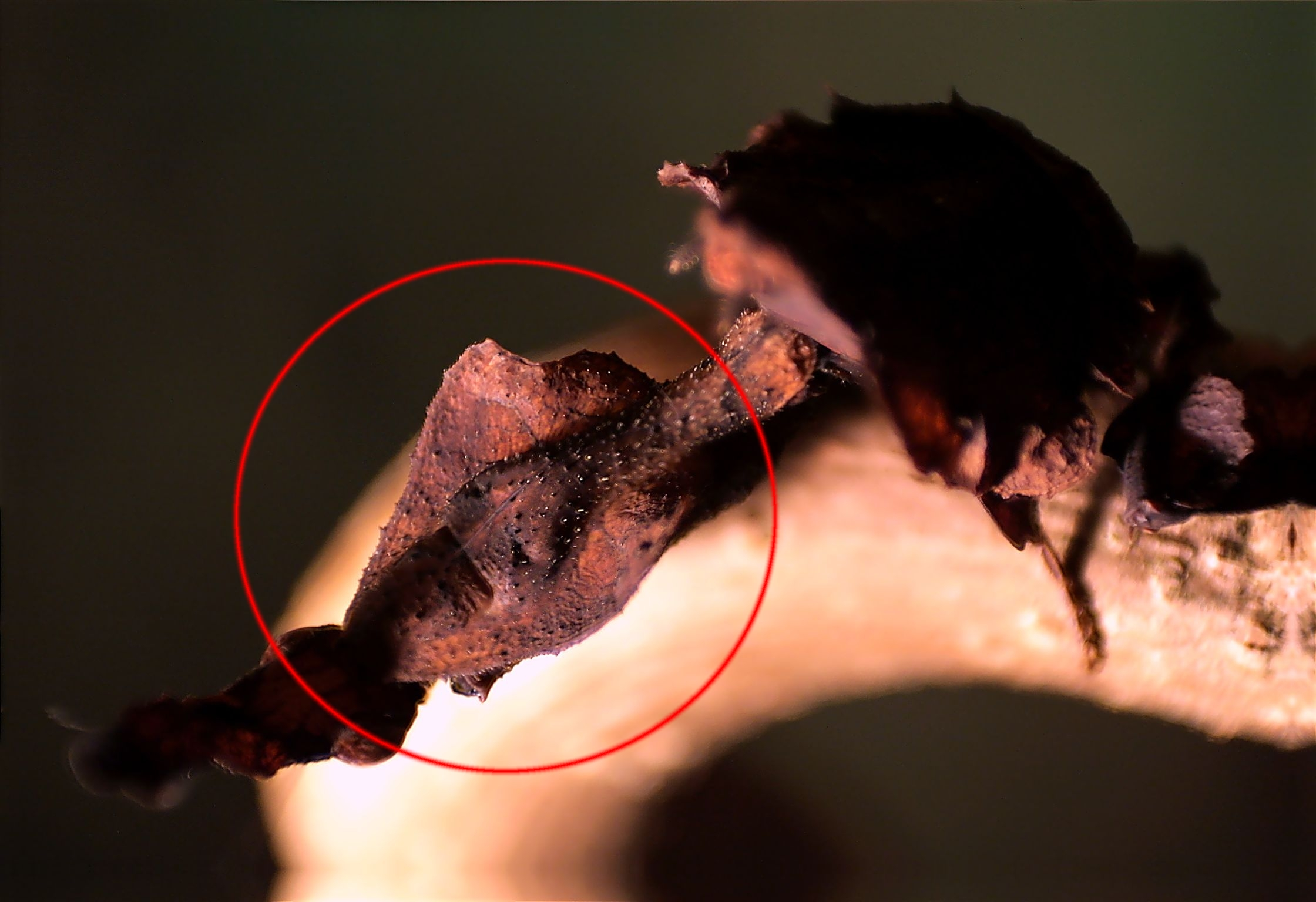
Carapace of a subadult female

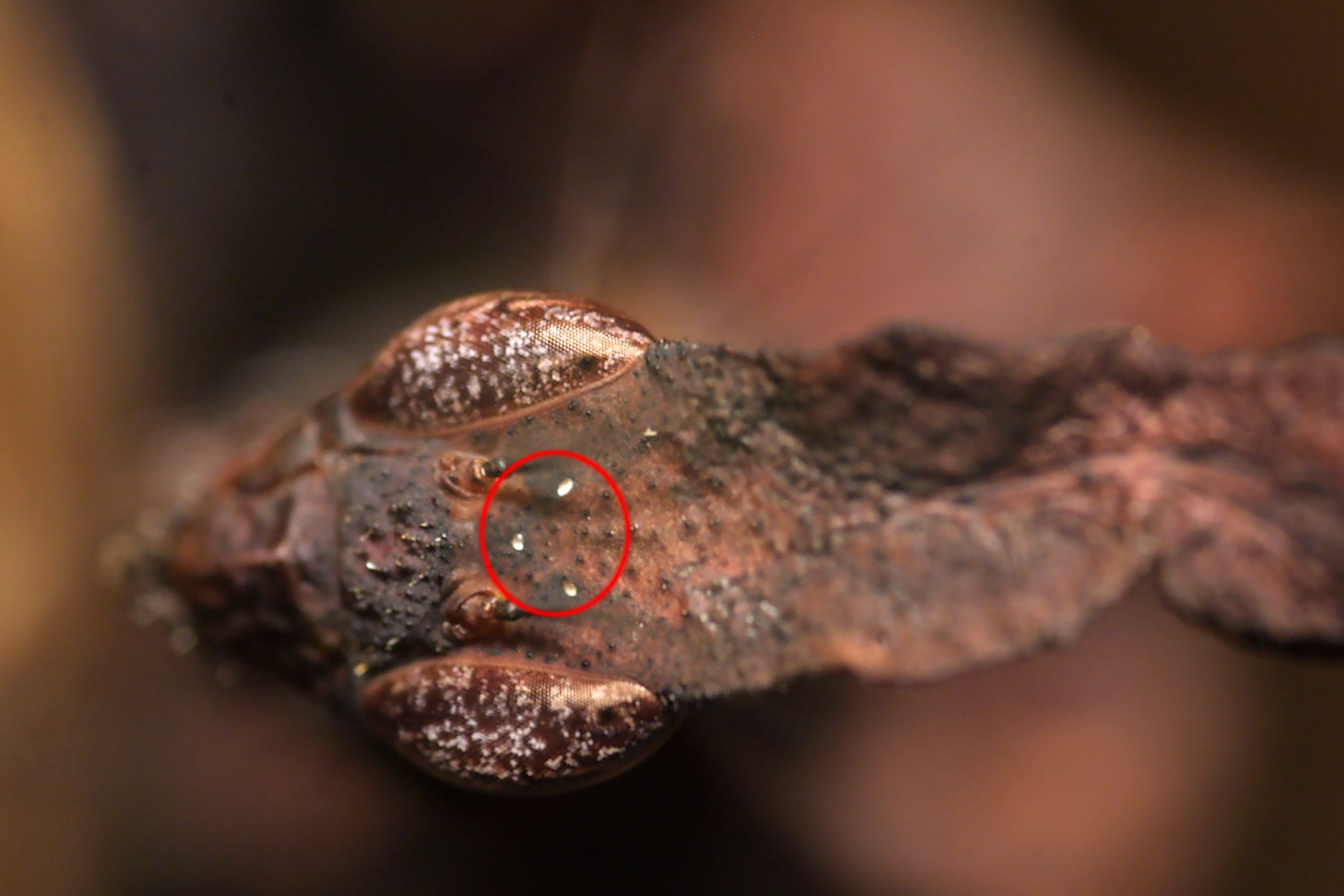
Female ocellus

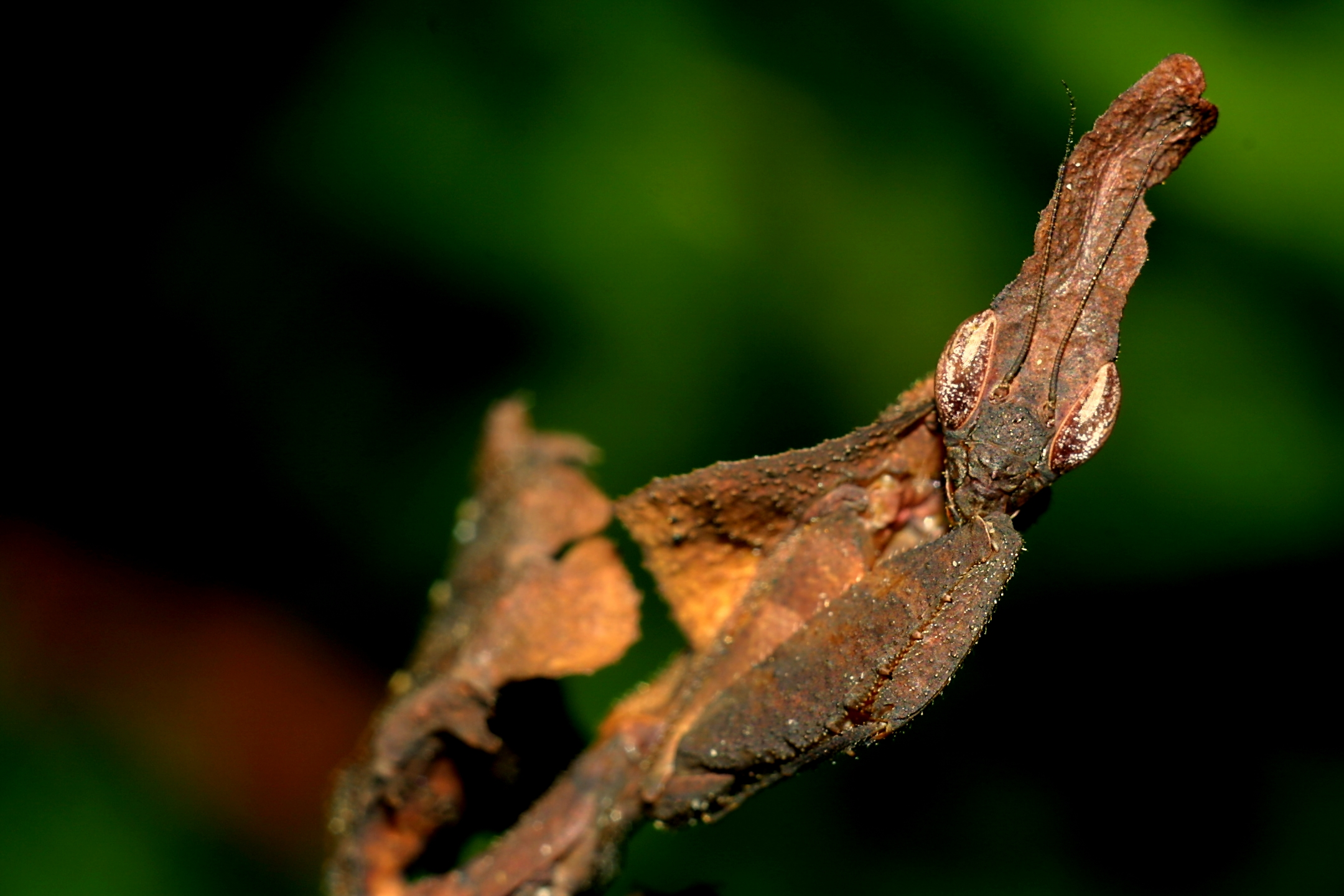
Subadult female

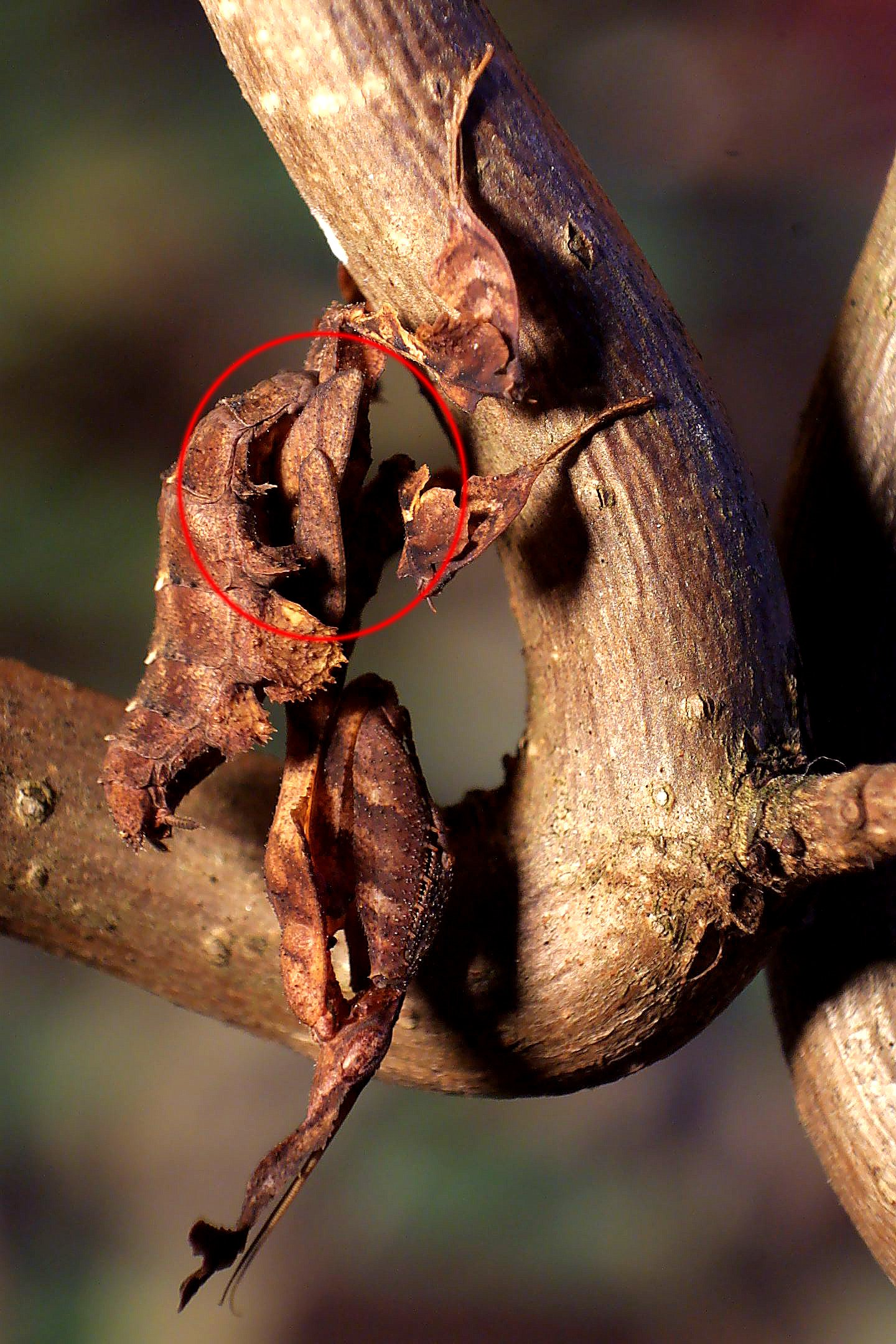
Subadult male's wing buds

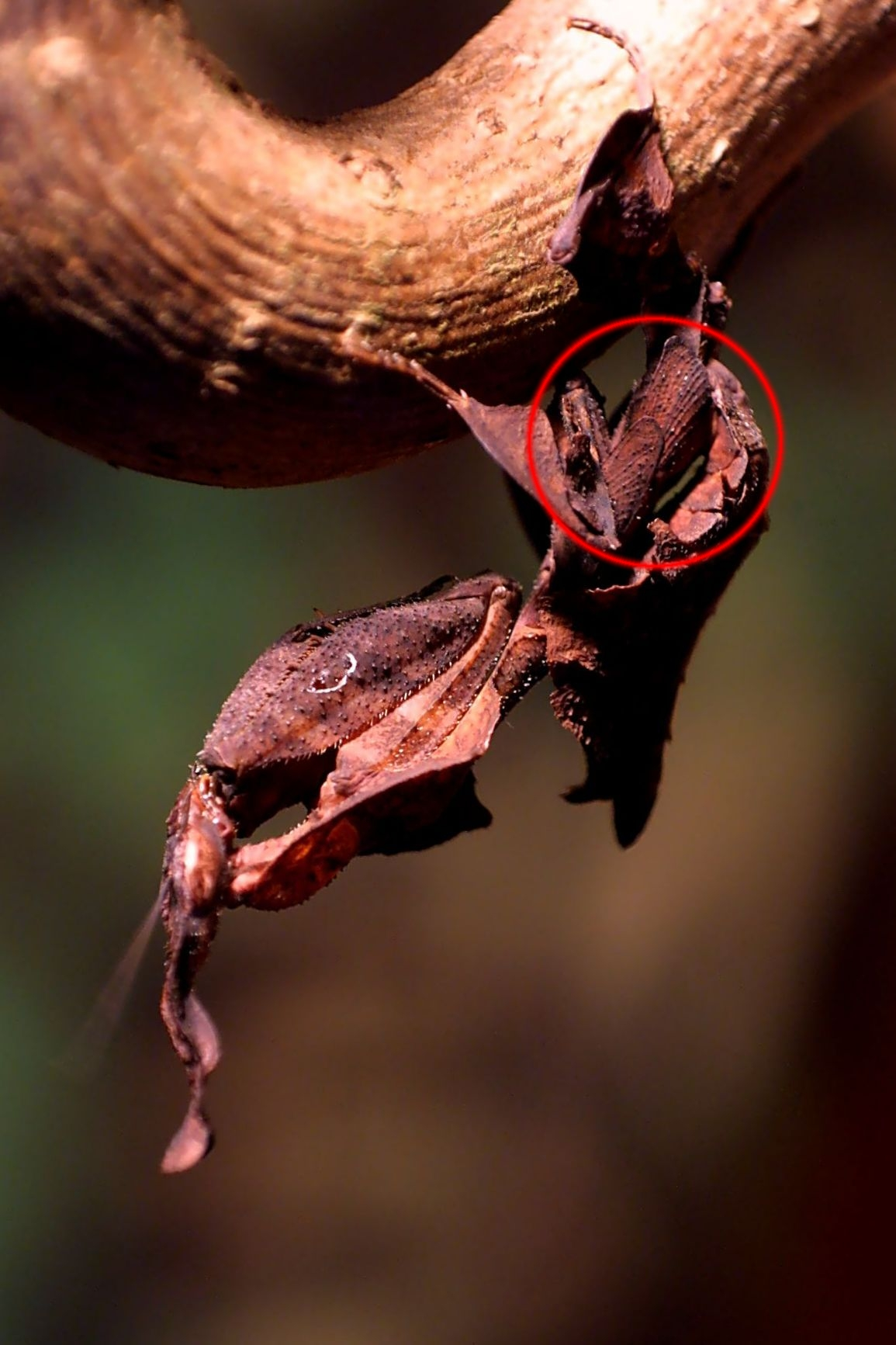
Subadult female's wing buds

== See also ==
- List of mantis genera and species
- Dead leaf mantis
- Extatosoma tiaratum
