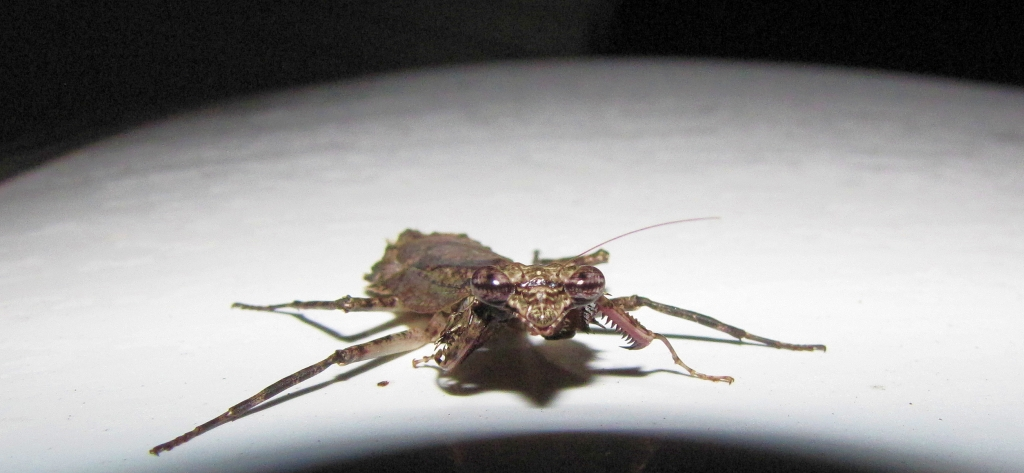
- G. grisea

Scientific classification
- Kingdom: Animalia
- Phylum: Arthropoda
- Clade: Pancrustacea
- Class: Insecta
- Order: Mantodea
- Family: Epaphroditidae
- Subfamily: Gonatistinae
- Genus: Gonatista; Saussure, 1869

Species
- See text

= Gonatista =

Genus of praying mantises

Gonatista is a genus of praying mantises in the family Epaphroditidae.

The following species are recognised in the genus Gonatista:

- Gonatista grisea
- Gonatista jaiba
- Gonatista major
- Gonatista phryganoides
- Gonatista reticulata

According to a 2004 paper by entomologists from the University of Catania and the National Museum of Natural History this genus:

...is widely distributed in North America and the Caribbean area. There are (five) homogeneous species...whose specific differences such as chromatic models and body size, as shown in literature (Caudell 1912), do not help us in their identification. On the basis of the material studied here we have verified that a valid diagnostic character is the morphology of the external copulatory apparatus

== See also ==
- List of mantis genera and species
