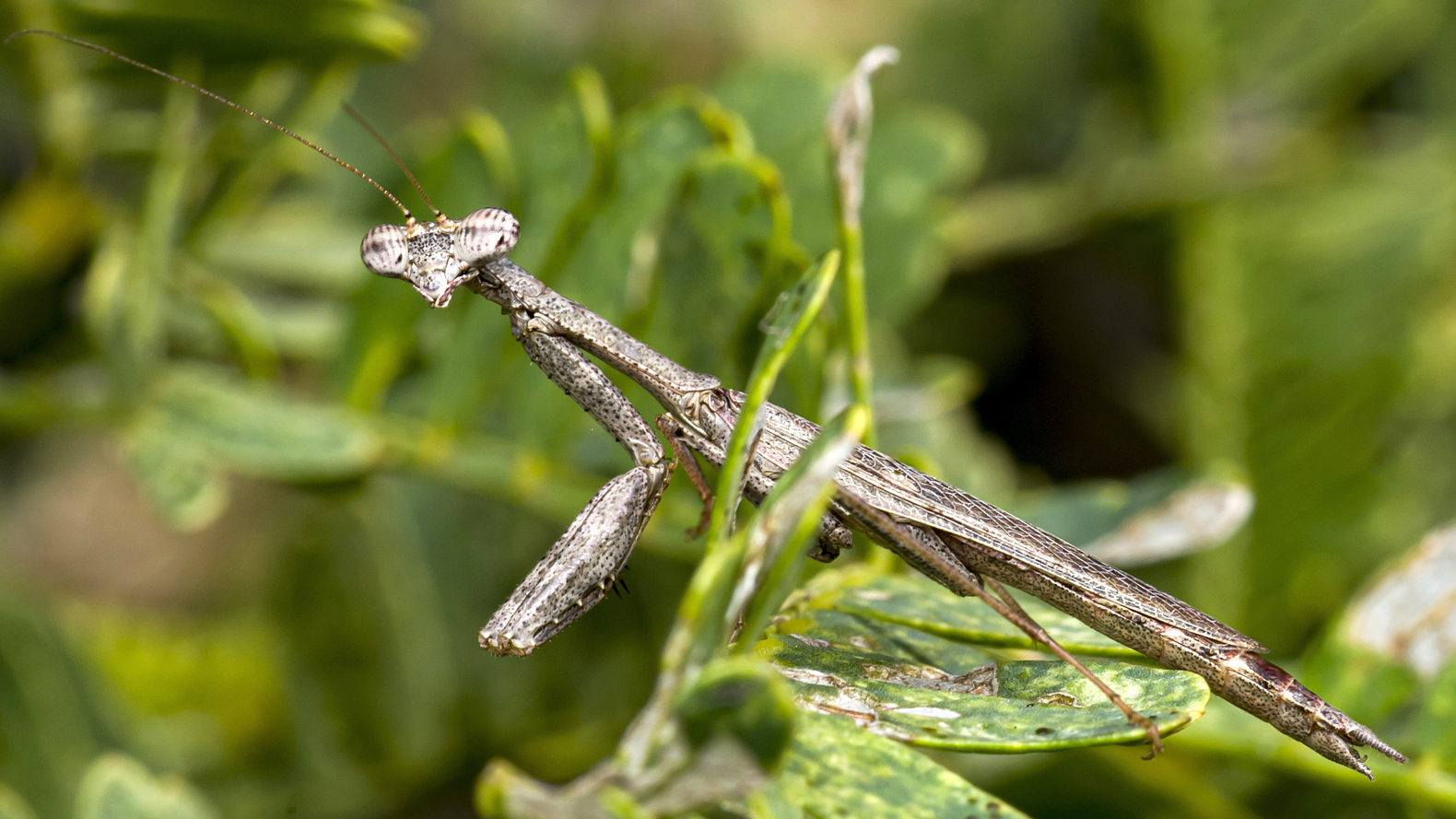

Scientific classification
- Kingdom: Animalia
- Phylum: Arthropoda
- Clade: Pancrustacea
- Class: Insecta
- Order: Mantodea
- Family: Epaphroditidae
- Genus: Callimantis; Stål, 1877
- Species: C. antillarum

Binomial name
- Callimantis antillarum (Saussure, 1859)

= Callimantis =

Callimantis antillarum

Genus of praying mantises

Callimantis is a genus of mantises of the family Epaphroditidae consisting of only one species, Callimantis antillarum.

== Species ==
Callimantis antillarum is a praying mantis species that comes from a very ancient lineage. When Gondwanaland broke up around 107 MYA, the phylogenetic group split into three Antillean endemic groups known as Callimantis, Epaphrodita, and Gonatistacame. These are referred to as Neotropical or Old World lineages. Callimantis do not have the special traits that place them into the Stagmomantinae subfamily other than a plain green appearance.
