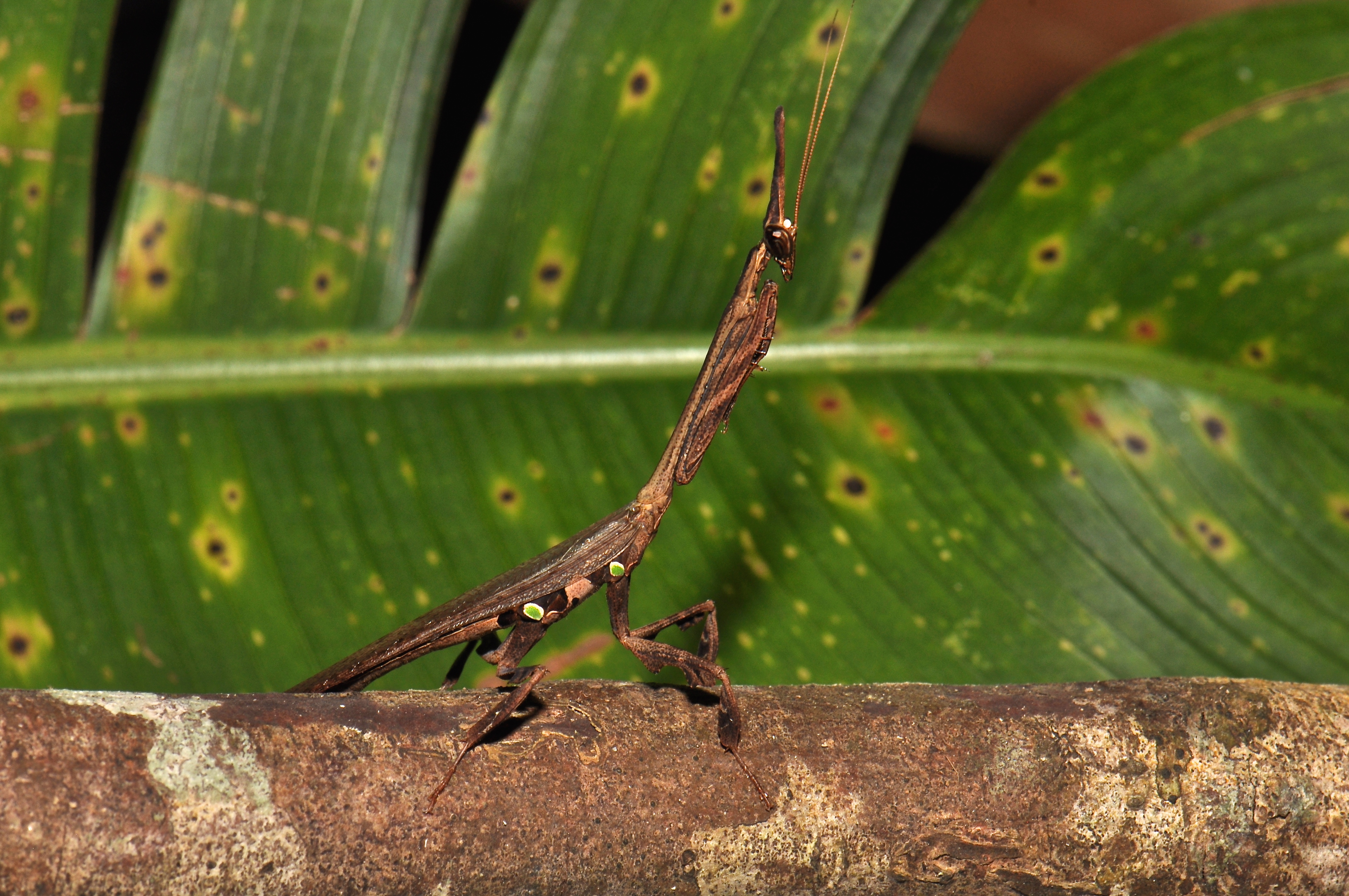

Scientific classification
- Kingdom: Animalia
- Phylum: Arthropoda
- Clade: Pancrustacea
- Class: Insecta
- Order: Mantodea
- Family: Hymenopodidae
- Subfamily: Phyllothelyinae
- Tribe: Phyllothelyini
- Genus: Ceratocrania
- Species: C. macra

Binomial name
- Ceratocrania macra Westwood, 1889

= Ceratocrania macra =

Species of praying mantis

Ceratocrania macra is a mantis species in the family Hymenopodidae. Its English common name is bark-horned mantis. No subspecies are listed. It is found in Java, Borneo, and Sumatra.
