= Chroicopteridae =

Scientific classification
- Kingdom: Animalia
- Phylum: Arthropoda
- Clade: Pancrustacea
- Class: Insecta
- Order: Mantodea
- Clade: Nanomantodea
- Superfamily: Chroicopteroidea; Giglio-Tos, 1915
- Family: Chroicopteridae; Giglio-Tos, 1915

Family of praying mantises

The Chroicopteridae are a family of praying mantids, based on the type genus Chroicoptera. The name is derived from first use, for subfamily Chroicopterinae, by Giglio-Tos and it has been revived as part of a major revision of mantid taxonomy. Some genera have also been moved here from the tribe Rivetinini, with others placed elsewhere including the subfamily Miomantinae.

The new placement is as a sole family in the superfamily Chroicopteroidea (of group Cernomantodea) and infraorder Schizomantodea. Genera in this family have been recorded from Africa and islands in the Atlantic and Indian oceans.

== Subfamilies, tribes and genera ==
The Mantodea Species File lists two subfamilies:

=== Chroicopterinae ===
tribe Bolbellini

- Bolbella Giglio-Tos, 1915
- Dystactula Giglio-Tos, 1927

tribe Chroicopterini

- subtribe Amphecostephanina
  - Amphecostephanus Rehn, 1912
- subtribe Bisanthina
  - Bisanthe Stal, 1876
- subtribe Chroicopterina
  - Betamantis Giglio-Tos, 1915
  - Carvilia Stal, 1876
  - Chopardentella Kaltenbach, 1996
  - Chroicoptera Stal, 1871
  - Congomantis Werner, 1929
  - Entella Stal, 1877
  - Entelloptera Beier, 1942
  - Geothespis Giglio-Tos, 1916
  - Ligaria Stal, 1877
  - Ligariella Giglio-Tos, 1915
  - Ligentella Kaltenbach, 1996
  - Macracanthopus Chopard, 1929
  - Namamantis Kaltenbach, 1996
  - Paraligaria Beier, 1969
  - Parentella Giglio-Tos, 1915
  - Rhachimantis Giglio-Tos, 1915
  - Sphaeromantis Schulthess, 1898
- subtribe Dystactina
  - Achlaena Karsch, 1892
  - Achlaenella Giglio-Tos, 1915
  - Dystacta Saussure, 1871
  - Pseudodystacta Kaltenbach, 1996

=== Tarachininae ===
Auth. Giglio-Tos (1915); tropical central Africa

tribe Gonypetellini

- Gonypetella Giglio-Tos, 1915
- Telomantis Giglio-Tos, 1915

tribe Tarachinini

- Tarachina Werner, 1907
