= Epaphrodita =

Scientific classification
- Kingdom: Animalia
- Phylum: Arthropoda
- Clade: Pancrustacea
- Class: Insecta
- Order: Mantodea
- Family: Epaphroditidae
- Subfamily: Epaphroditinae
- Genus: Epaphrodita; Serville, 1831

Genus of praying mantises

Epaphrodita is a genus of praying mantids in the family Epaphroditidae. It is the type genus of its family. It is distributed in Hispaniola and Saint Lucia.

== Species ==
There are two or three recognized species:

- Epaphrodita lobivertex Lombardo & Perez-Gelabert, 2004
- Epaphrodita musarum Palisot de Beauvois, 1805 (=Epaphrodita dentifrons Saussure, 1872)
- Epaphrodita undulata Saussure, 1870

Moulin and colleagues consider Epaphrodita undulata a synonym of Epaphrodita musarum.

== See also ==
- List of mantis genera and species
