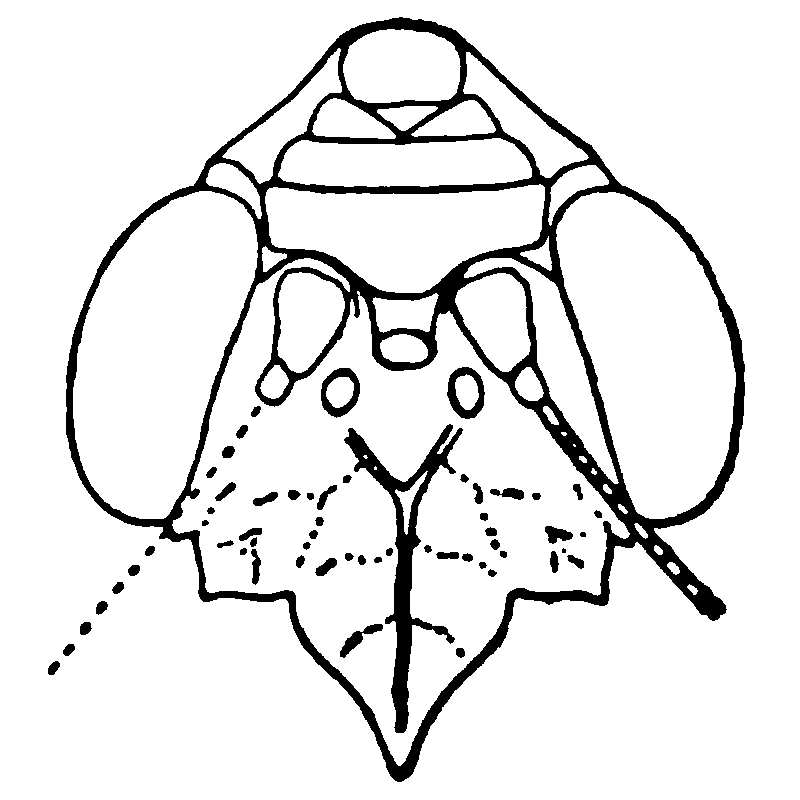

Scientific classification
- Kingdom: Animalia
- Phylum: Arthropoda
- Clade: Pancrustacea
- Class: Insecta
- Order: Mantodea
- Family: Chroicopteridae
- Subfamily: Chroicopterinae
- Genus: Amphecostephanus; Rehn, 1912
- Species: A. rex

Binomial name
- Amphecostephanus rex Rehn, 1912

= Amphecostephanus =

Genus of praying mantises

Amphecostephanus is a monotypic genus of praying mantises in the family Chroicopteridae. It s represented by a single species, Amphecostephanus rex, the king amphecostephanus, that is found in Angola and Malawi. It was first described by James A. G. Rehn in 1912.

== See also ==
- List of mantis genera and species
