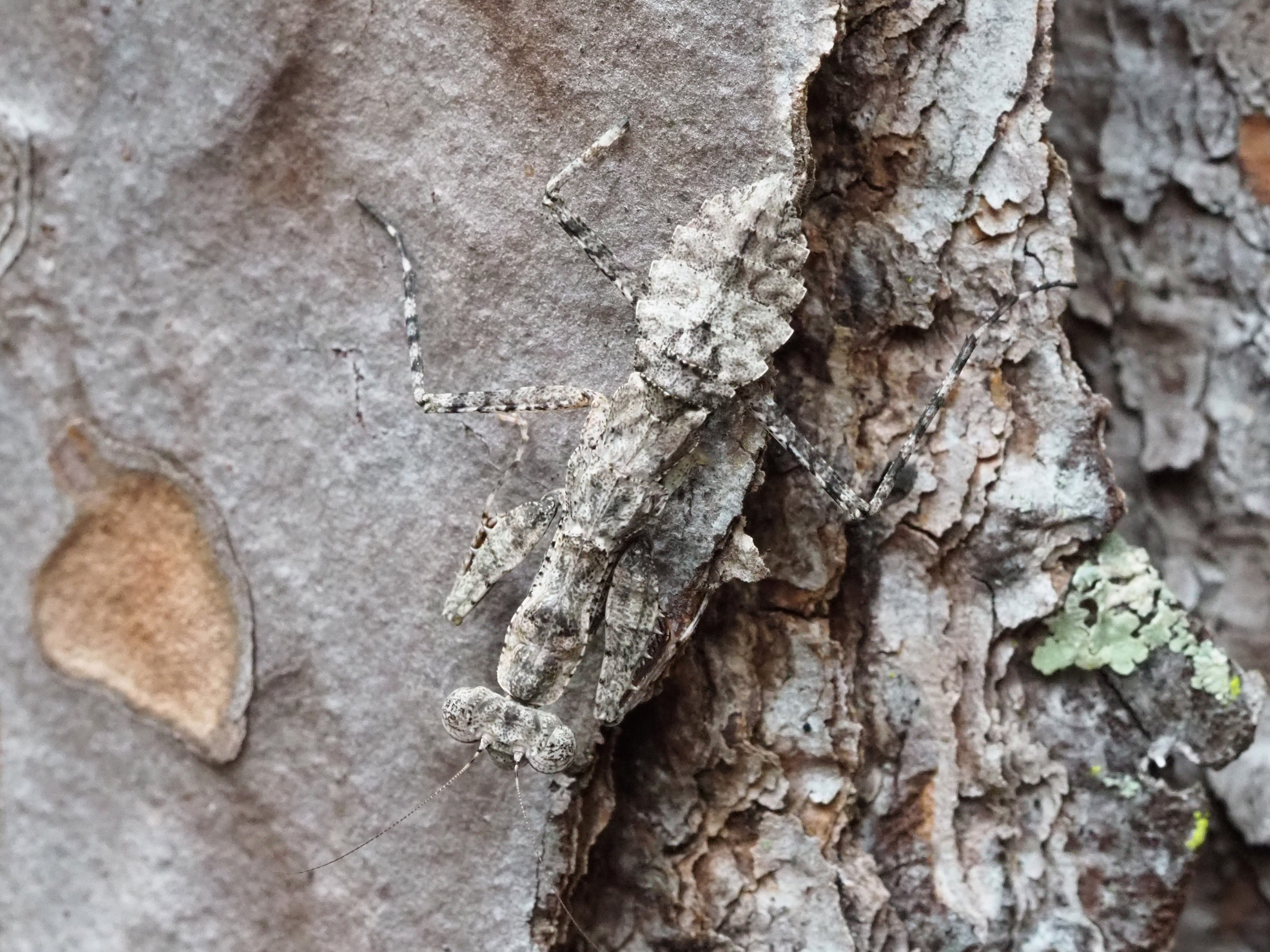

Scientific classification
- Kingdom: Animalia
- Phylum: Arthropoda
- Clade: Pancrustacea
- Class: Insecta
- Order: Mantodea
- Family: Epaphroditidae
- Genus: Gonatista
- Species: G. grisea

Binomial name
- Gonatista grisea Fabricius, 1793

= Gonatista grisea =

Grizzled mantis

Species of praying mantis

Gonatista grisea, common name grizzled mantis, Florida bark mantis or lichen mimic mantis, is a species of praying mantis native to the southern United States, primarily Florida. They commonly perch on trees facing down to wait for prey, and will eat any insect they can overpower.

== See also ==
- List of mantis genera and species
