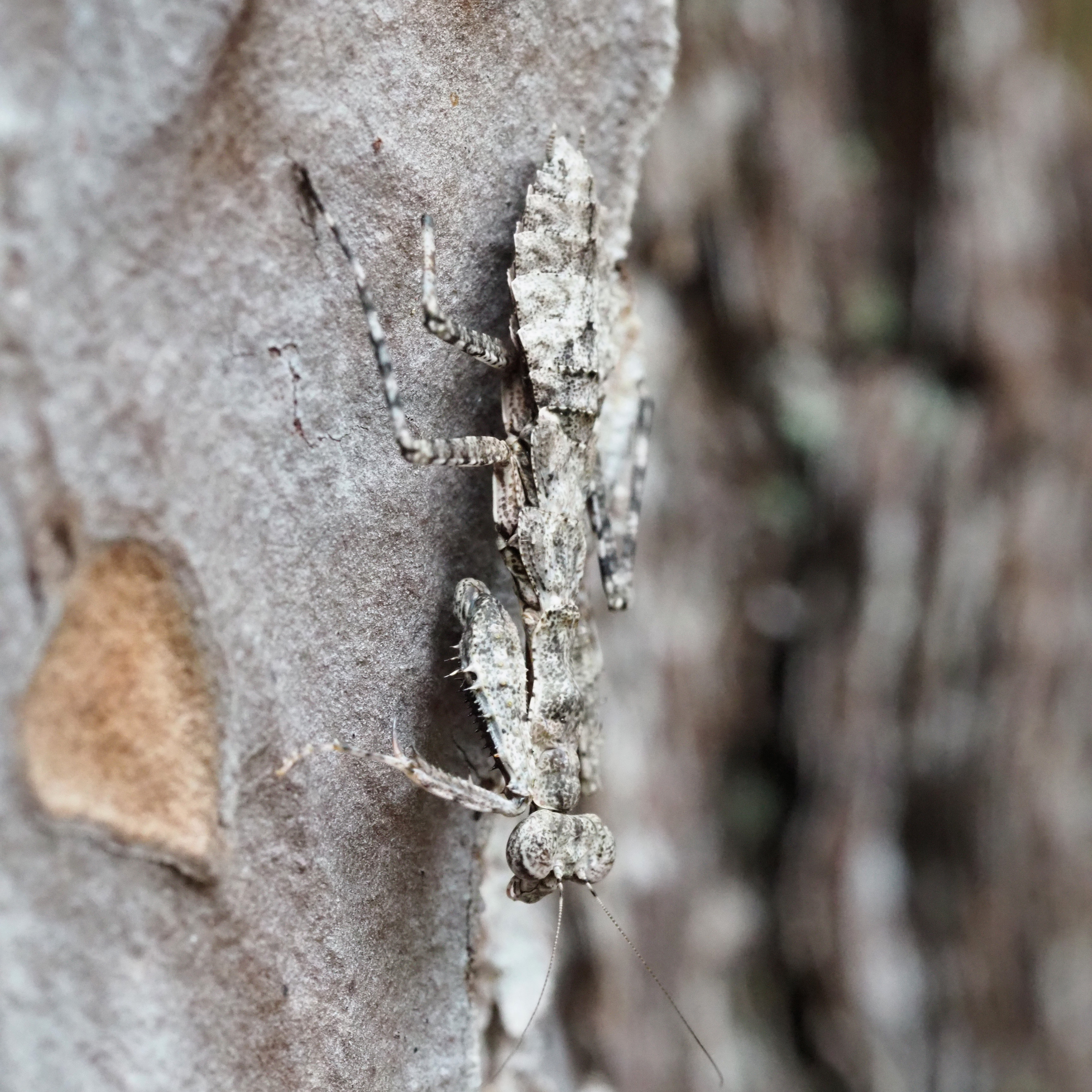
- Grizzled mantis (Gonatista grisea)

Scientific classification
- Kingdom: Animalia
- Phylum: Arthropoda
- Clade: Pancrustacea
- Class: Insecta
- Order: Mantodea
- Superfamily: Epaphroditoidea
- Family: Epaphroditidae; Burmeister, 1838

Genera
- See text

Synonyms
- Acanthopsites, Epaphroditinae.

= Epaphroditidae =

Family of praying mantises

Epaphroditidae is a family of the Mantodea, containing species found in Africa and the Caribbean. Before 2015, it had been placed as the subfamily Epaphroditinae, in the Hymenopodidae, but is now excluded.

== Subfamilies and genera ==
The Mantodea Species File lists two subfamilies containing the genera:

=== Epaphroditinae ===
tribe Callimantini

- Callimantis Stal, 1877 - monotypic (C. antillarum Saussure, 1859)

tribe Epaphroditini

- Epaphrodita Serville, 1831

=== Gonatistinae ===
- Gonatista Saussure, 1869
- Gonatistella Giglio-Tos, 1915 - monotypic (G. nigropicta Westwood, 1889)

=== Now moved ===
- Brancsikia Saussure & Zehntner, 1895 is in the new (2019) family Majangidae.
