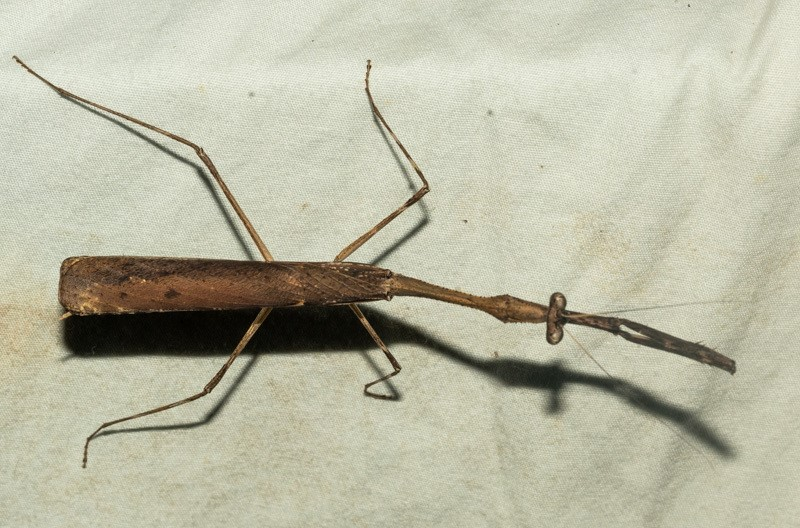
- Peacock Mantis (Pseudempusa pinnapavonis)

Scientific classification
- Kingdom: Animalia
- Phylum: Arthropoda
- Clade: Pancrustacea
- Class: Insecta
- Order: Mantodea
- Family: Deroplatyidae
- Subfamily: Deroplatyinae
- Tribe: Deroplatyini

Genera
- see text

= Deroplatyini =

Tribe of praying mantises

Deroplatyini is a tribe of praying mantises in the family Deroplatyidae.

== Genera and species ==
The Mantodea Species File lists the following genera:

- Deroplatys (Westwood, 1839)
  - Deroplatys angustata Westwood, 1845
  - Deroplatys cordata (Fabricius, 1798)
  - Deroplatys desiccata (Westwood, 1839)
  - Deroplatys gorochovi (Anisyutkin, 1998)
  - Deroplatys indica (Roy, 2007)
  - Deroplatys lobata (Guérin-Méneville (1838)
  - Deroplatys moultoni (Giglio-Tos, 1917)
  - Deroplatys philippinica (Werner, 1922)
  - Deroplatys rhombica (Brunner, 1897)
  - Deroplatys sarawaca (Westwood, 1889)
  - Deroplatys trigonodera (Westwood, 1889)
  - Deroplatys truncata (Guerin-Meneville, 1843)
- Mythomantis Giglio-Tos, 1916
  - Mythomantis confusa Westwood, 1889
  - Mythomantis gracilis Werner, 1922
  - Mythomantis serrata Schwarz & Helmkampf, 2014
- Pseudempusa Brunner v. W., 1893
  - Pseudempusa pavonina Giglio-Tos, 1916
  - Pseudempusa pinnapavonis Brunner, 1893

Note: the genus Brancsikia Saussure & Zehntner, 1895 is now placed in the family Epaphroditidae.

== See also ==
- Dead Leaf Mantis
- List of mantis genera and species
