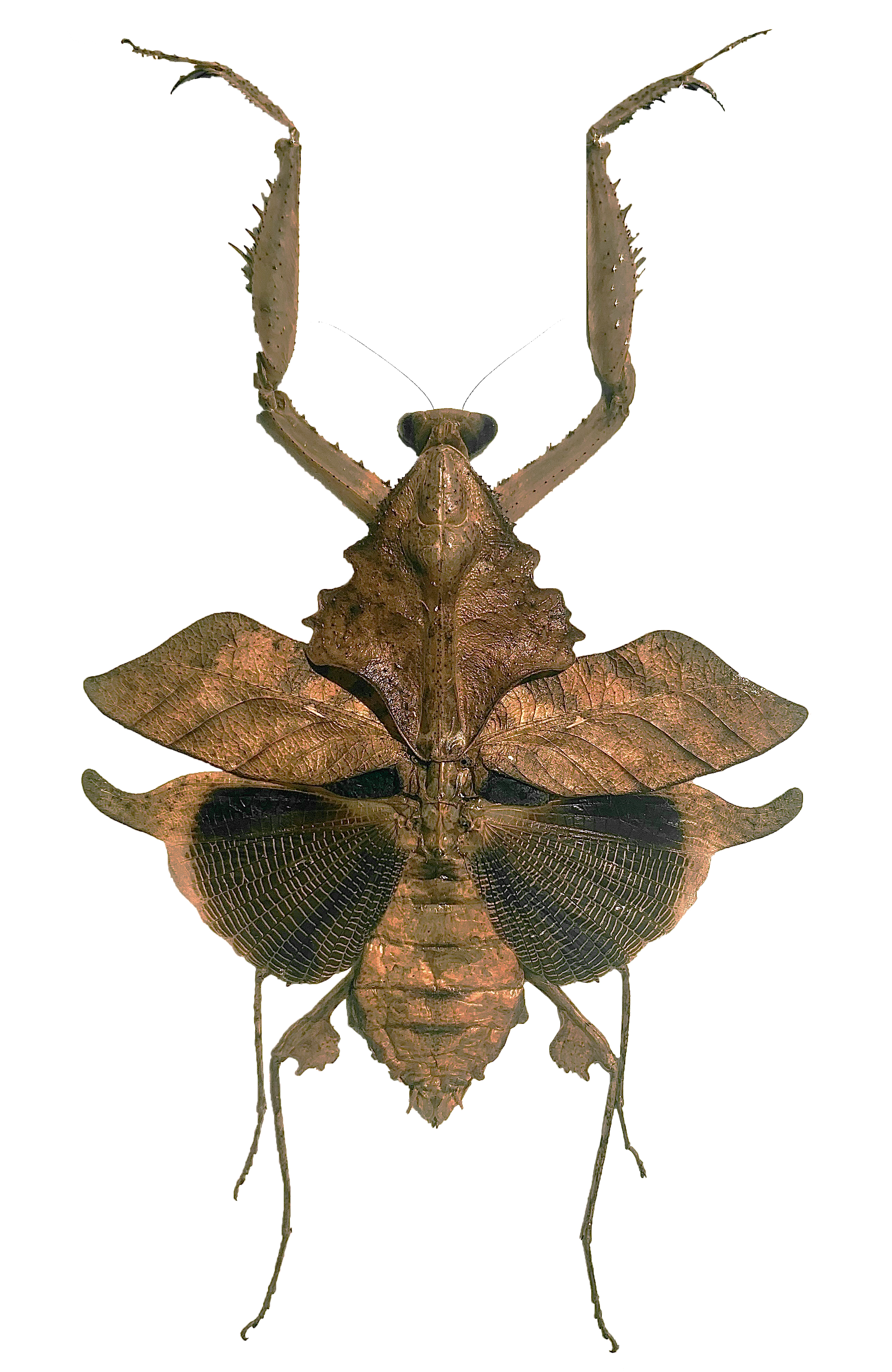
- Deroplatys xuzhengfai adult female specimen from the private collection of Andrew Markey, collected in 2020

Scientific classification
- Kingdom: Animalia
- Phylum: Arthropoda
- Clade: Pancrustacea
- Class: Insecta
- Order: Mantodea
- Family: Deroplatyidae
- Genus: Deroplatys
- Species: D. xuzhengfai

Binomial name
- Deroplatys xuzhengfai (Zhang & Price, 2024)

= Deroplatys xuzhengfai =

Species of praying mantis

Deroplatys xuzhengfai is a species of praying mantis in the family Deroplatyidae. This "dead leaf mantis" species is native to Borneo.

== See also ==
- Mantises of Southeast Asia
- List of mantis genera and species
