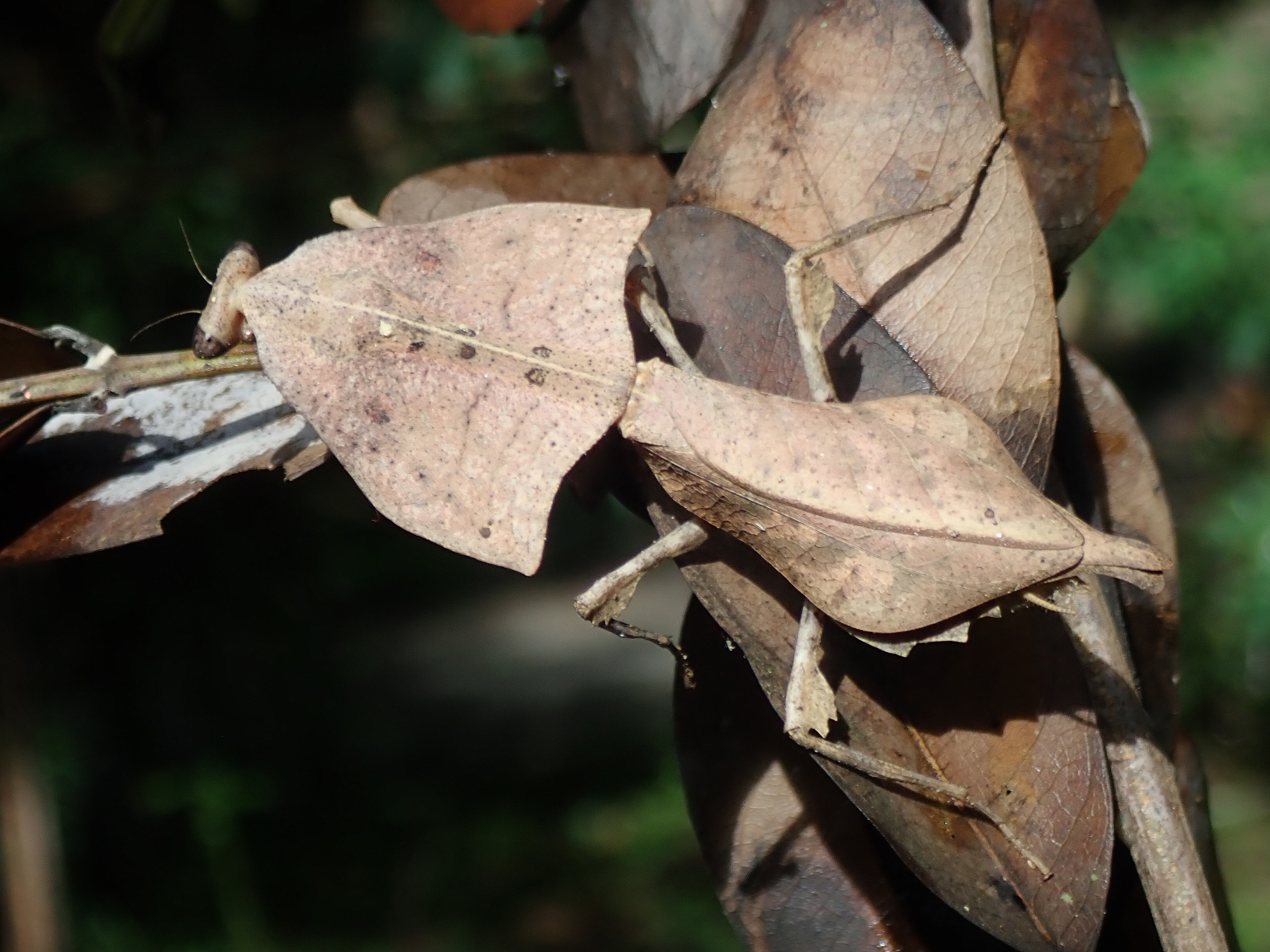
- D. gorochovi specimen found in Cát Tiên National Park

Scientific classification
- Kingdom: Animalia
- Phylum: Arthropoda
- Clade: Pancrustacea
- Class: Insecta
- Order: Mantodea
- Family: Deroplatyidae
- Subfamily: Deroplatyinae
- Tribe: Deroplatyini
- Genus: Deroplatys
- Species: D. gorochovi

Binomial name
- Deroplatys gorochovi Anisyutkin (1998)

= Deroplatys gorochovi =

Species of praying mantis

Deroplatys gorochovi is a species of praying mantis in the subfamily Deroplatyinae and the new (2019) family Deroplatyidae.

This "dead leaf mantis" species is native to the tropical forests of southern Vietnam.

== See also ==
- Mantises of Southeast Asia
