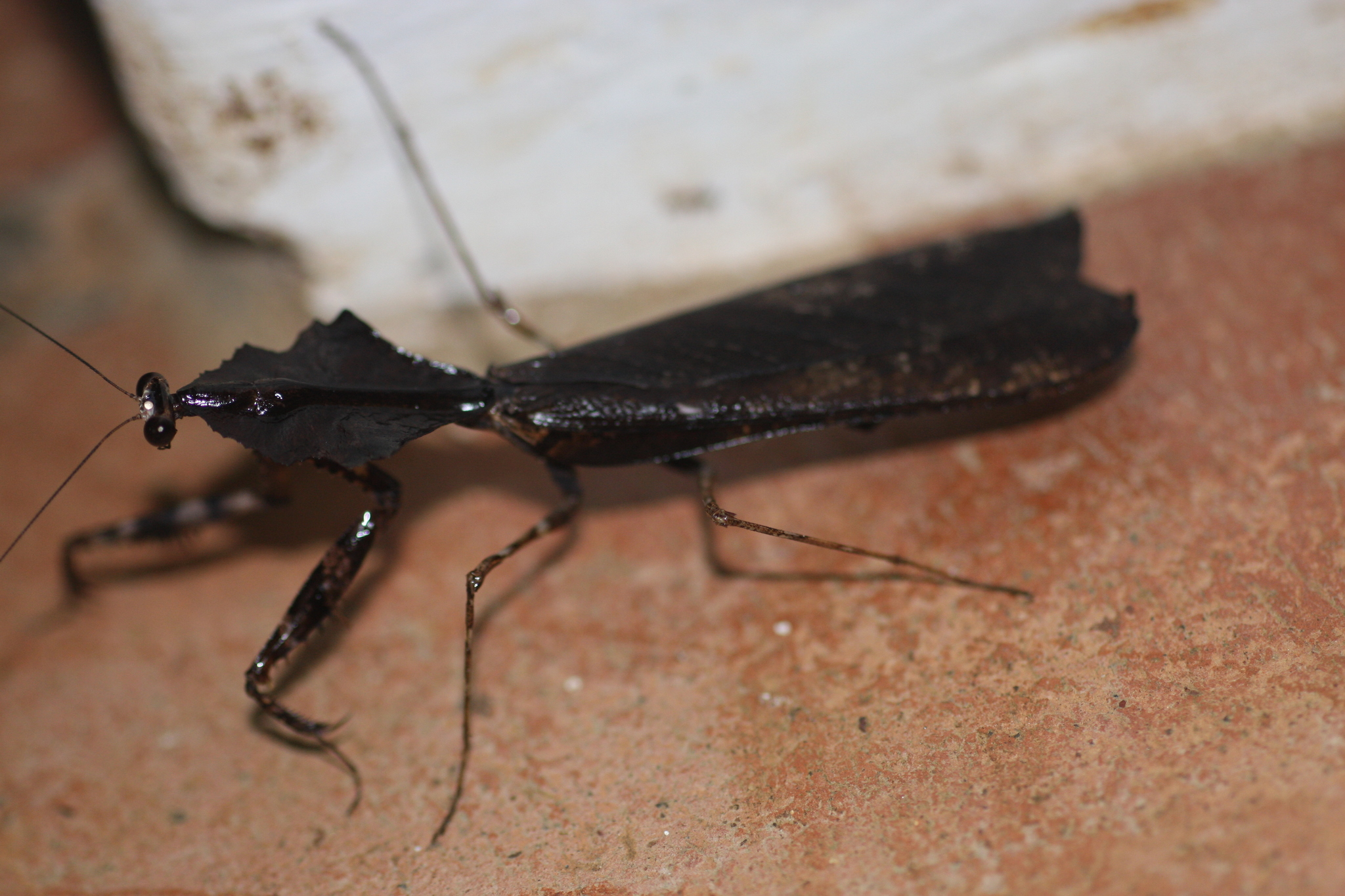
- From Wayanad, Kerala, India

Scientific classification
- Kingdom: Animalia
- Phylum: Arthropoda
- Clade: Pancrustacea
- Class: Insecta
- Order: Mantodea
- Family: Deroplatyidae
- Genus: Deroplatys
- Species: D. indica

Binomial name
- Deroplatys indica Roy, 2007

= Deroplatys indica =

Species of praying mantis

Deroplatys indica is a species of praying mantis in the family Deroplatyidae. This species was first described in 2007 after a single male from India, preserved in the Muséum d'Histoire naturelle de la ville de Genève (MHNG), was further researched.

== See also ==
- Mantises of Asia
- List of mantis genera and species
