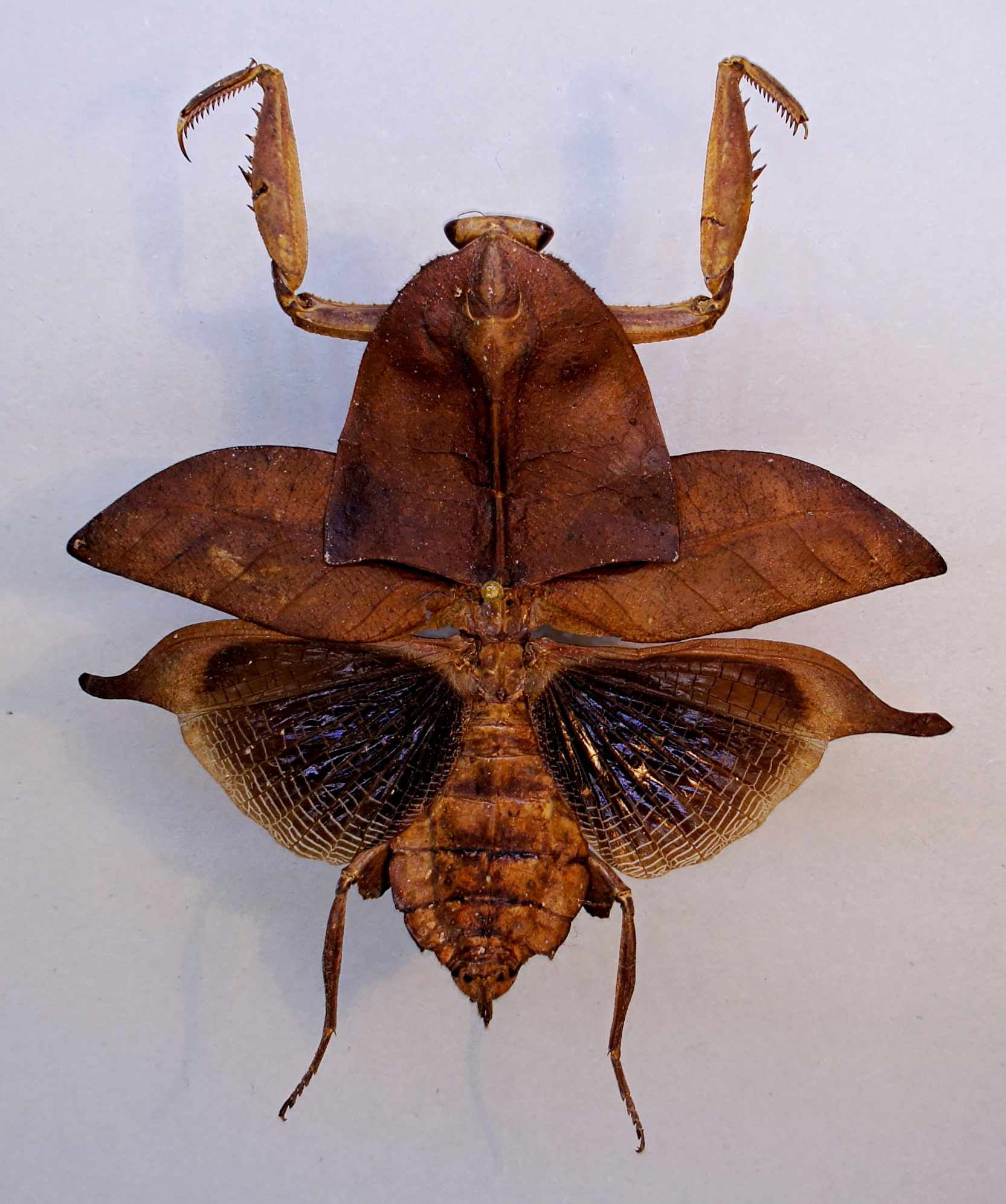
- Female at Zoologische Staatssammlung München

Scientific classification
- Kingdom: Animalia
- Phylum: Arthropoda
- Clade: Pancrustacea
- Class: Insecta
- Order: Mantodea
- Family: Deroplatyidae
- Genus: Deroplatys
- Species: D. truncata

Binomial name
- Deroplatys truncata (Guerin-Meneville, 1843)

Synonyms
- Deroplatys shelfordi Kirby, 1903; Deroplatys siccifolium (Saussure, 1870)

= Deroplatys truncata =

Species of praying mantis

Deroplatys truncata is a species of praying mantis in the family Deroplatyidae.

This "dead leaf mantis" species is native to Southeast Asia. The species show brown to deep dark brown coloration. The rear wings show large dark brown to black markings. Its reflectance in the visible and near-infrared part of the spectrum resembles that of leaf litter.

== See also ==
- Mantises of Southeast Asia
- List of mantis genera and species
