= Deroplatys rhombica =

Scientific classification
- Kingdom: Animalia
- Phylum: Arthropoda
- Clade: Pancrustacea
- Class: Insecta
- Order: Mantodea
- Family: Deroplatyidae
- Genus: Deroplatys
- Species: D. rhombica

Binomial name
- Deroplatys rhombica Brunner (1897)

Species of praying mantis

Deroplatys rhombica is a species of praying mantis in the family Deroplatyidae.

== See also ==
- List of mantis genera and species
