= Deroplatys angustata =

Scientific classification
- Kingdom: Animalia
- Phylum: Arthropoda
- Clade: Pancrustacea
- Class: Insecta
- Order: Mantodea
- Family: Deroplatyidae
- Genus: Deroplatys
- Species: D. angustata

Binomial name
- Deroplatys angustata Westwood (1845)

Synonyms
- Deroplatys horrifica Westwood, 1889

Species of praying mantis

Deroplatys angustata is a species of praying mantis in the family Deroplatyinae.

This "dead leaf mantis" species is native to Southeast Asia.

== See also ==
- Mantises of Southeast Asia
- List of mantis genera and species
