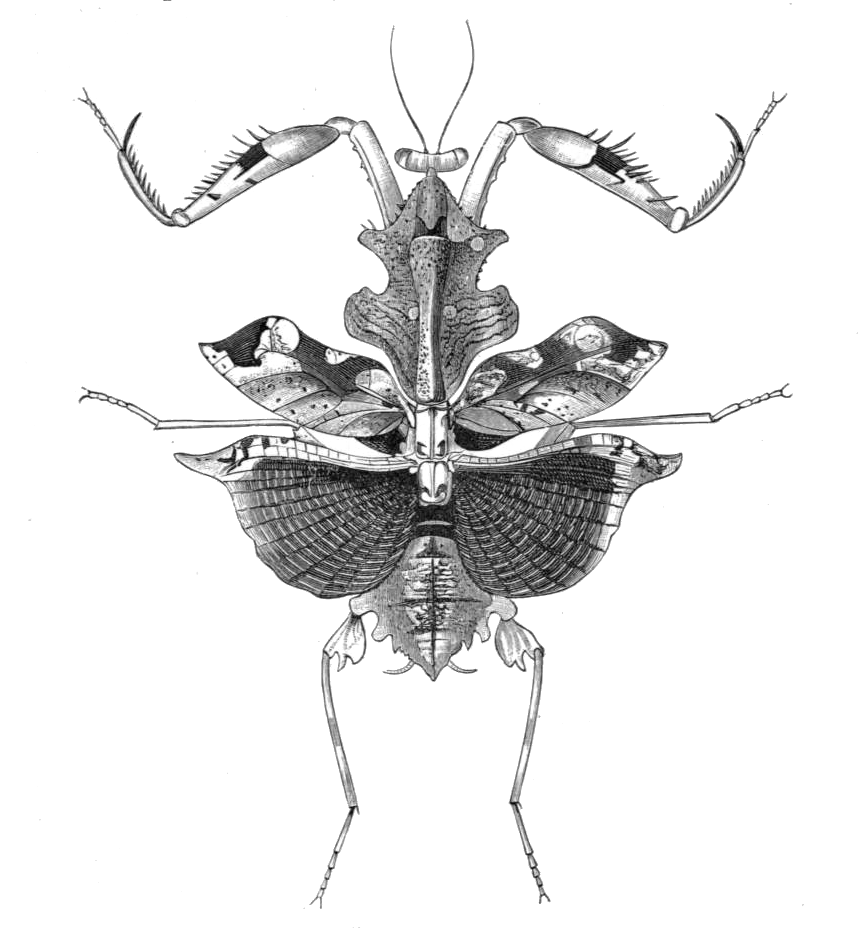
- Deroplatys sarawaca illustration from The Cambridge Natural History by David Sharp (1895)

Scientific classification
- Kingdom: Animalia
- Phylum: Arthropoda
- Clade: Pancrustacea
- Class: Insecta
- Order: Mantodea
- Family: Deroplatyidae
- Genus: Deroplatys
- Species: D. sarawaca

Binomial name
- Deroplatys sarawaca Westwood (1889)

= Deroplatys sarawaca =

Species of praying mantis

Deroplatys sarawaca is a species of praying mantis in the family Deroplatyidae. It is native to Borneo, including in Sarawak Province of Malaysia on the island. The holotype female is stored in the OUMNH collections.

== See also ==
- Mantises of Southeast Asia
- List of mantis genera and species
