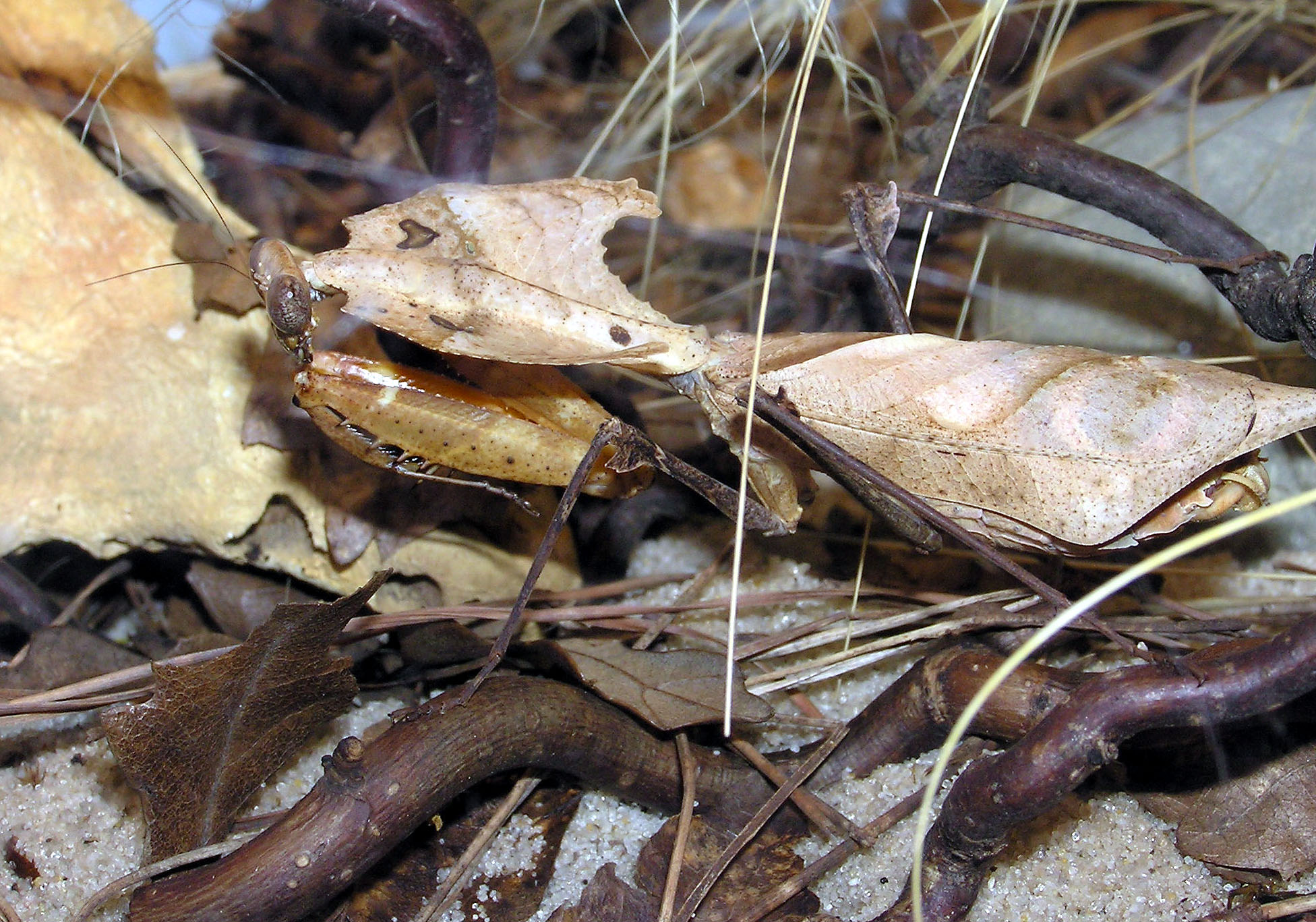
- Adult female Deroplatys desiccata photographed at Bristol Zoo in 2007

Scientific classification
- Kingdom: Animalia
- Phylum: Arthropoda
- Clade: Pancrustacea
- Class: Insecta
- Order: Mantodea
- Family: Deroplatyidae
- Subfamily: Deroplatyinae
- Tribe: Deroplatyini
- Genus: Deroplatys; Westwood (1839)

Species
- See text

= Deroplatys =

Genus of praying mantises

Deroplatys is a genus of mantis in the family Deroplatyidae. They are native to Asia and several share the common name of dead leaf mantis.

== Species ==
The latest revision by Zhang, Jia-Zhi & Price, Benjamin lists 14 total species:

- Deroplatys angustata (Westwood, 1845)
- Deroplatys desiccata (Westwood, 1839) - type species
- Deroplatys gorochovi (Anisyutkin, 1998)
- Deroplatys indica (Roy, 2007)
- Deroplatys kinabaluensis (Zhang & Price, 2024)
- Deroplatys lobata (Guérin-Méneville (1838)
- Deroplatys nebula (Zhang & Price, 2024)
- Deroplatys moultoni (Giglio-Tos, 1917)
- Deroplatys philippinica (Werner, 1922)
- Deroplatys rhombica (Brunner, 1897)
- Deroplatys sarawaca (Westwood, 1889)
- Deroplatys trigonodera (Westwood, 1889)
- Deroplatys truncata (Guerin-Meneville, 1843)
- Deroplatys xuzhengfai (Zhang & Price, 2024)

== Captivity ==
There are 5 Deroplatys species that are kept and bred in captivity (as exotic pets) and they are:

- Deroplatys desiccata
- Deroplatys lobata
- Deroplatys truncata
- Deroplatys gorochovi
- Deroplatys trigonodera

== Additional images ==
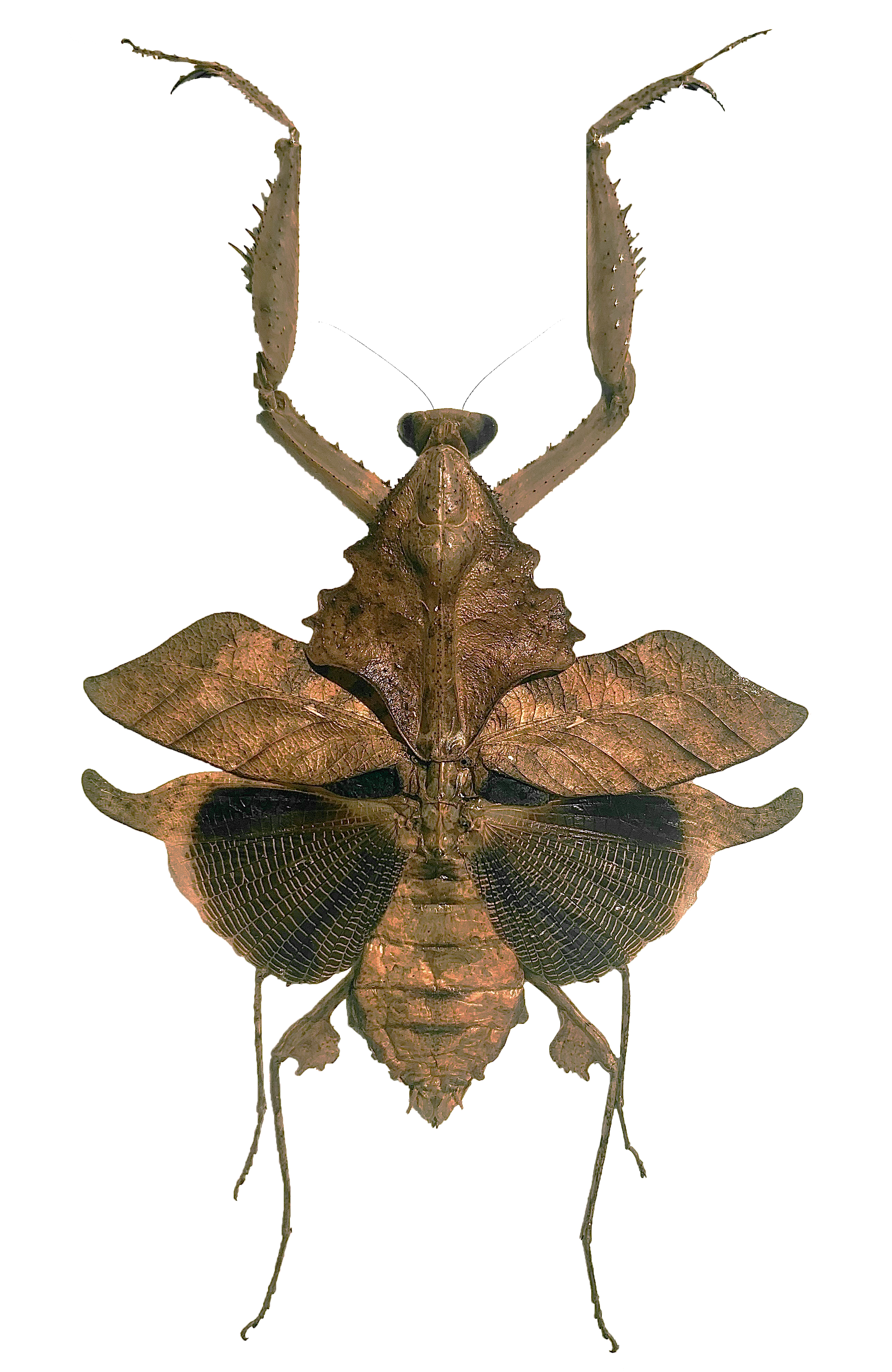
Deroplatys xuzhengfai female specimen

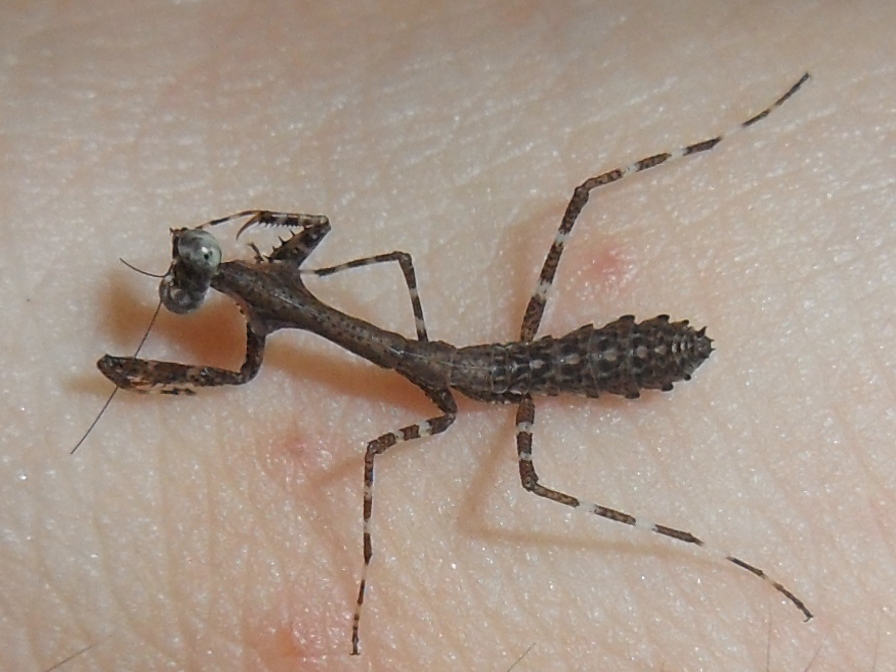
1st instar Deroplatys lobata nymph on a hand

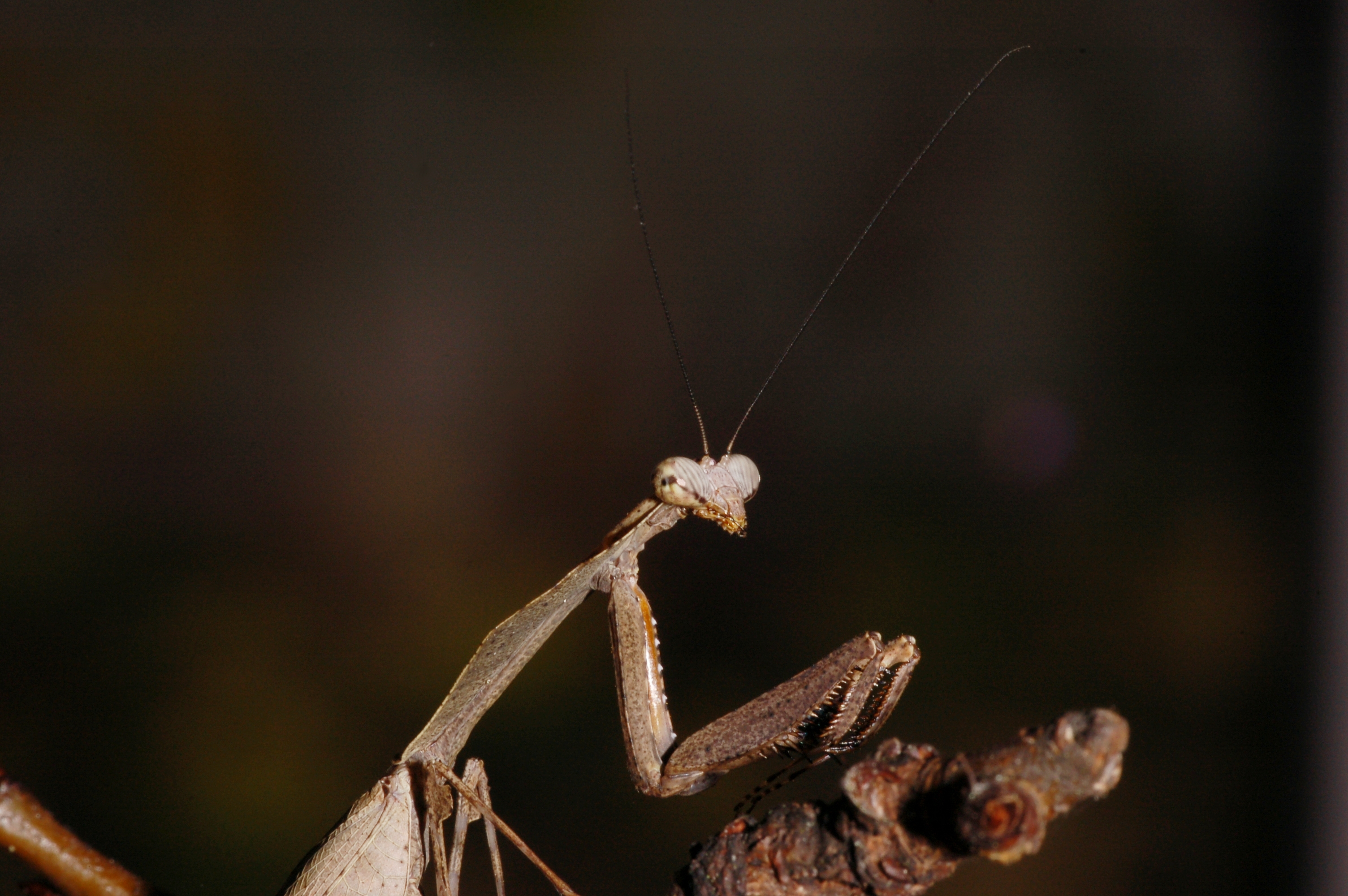
Adult male Deroplatys lobata

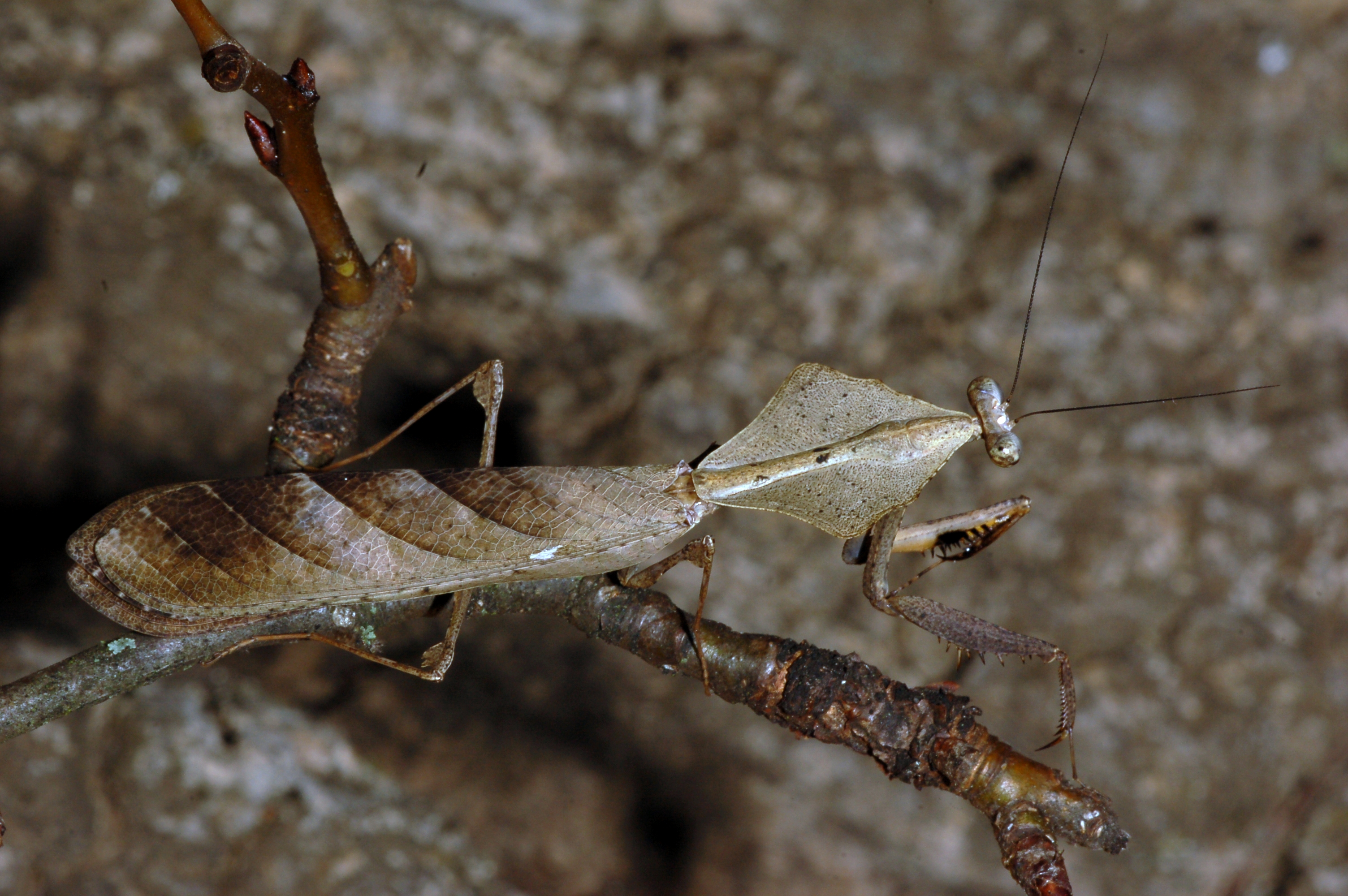
Adult male Deroplatys lobata

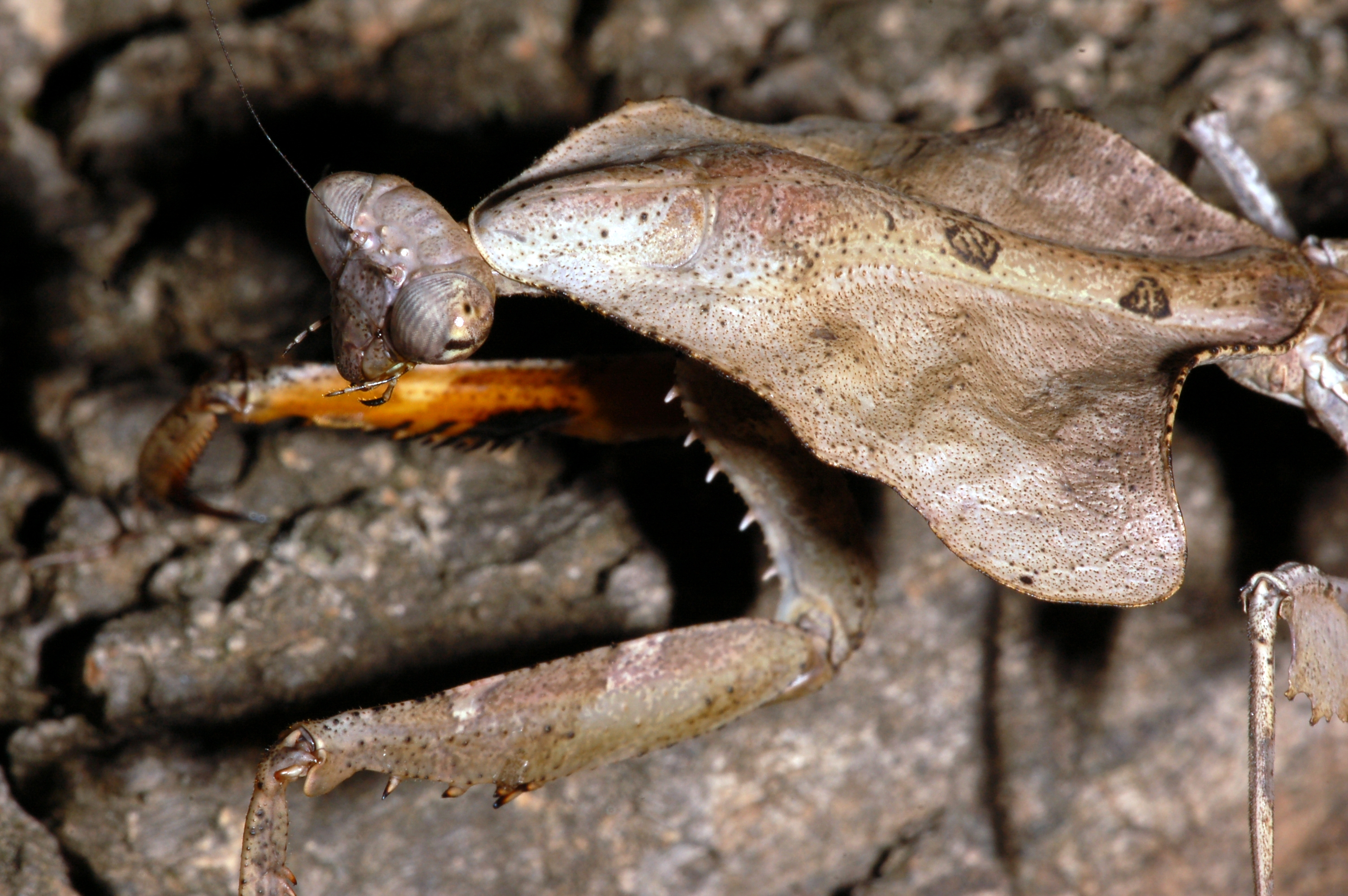
Adult female Deroplatys lobata

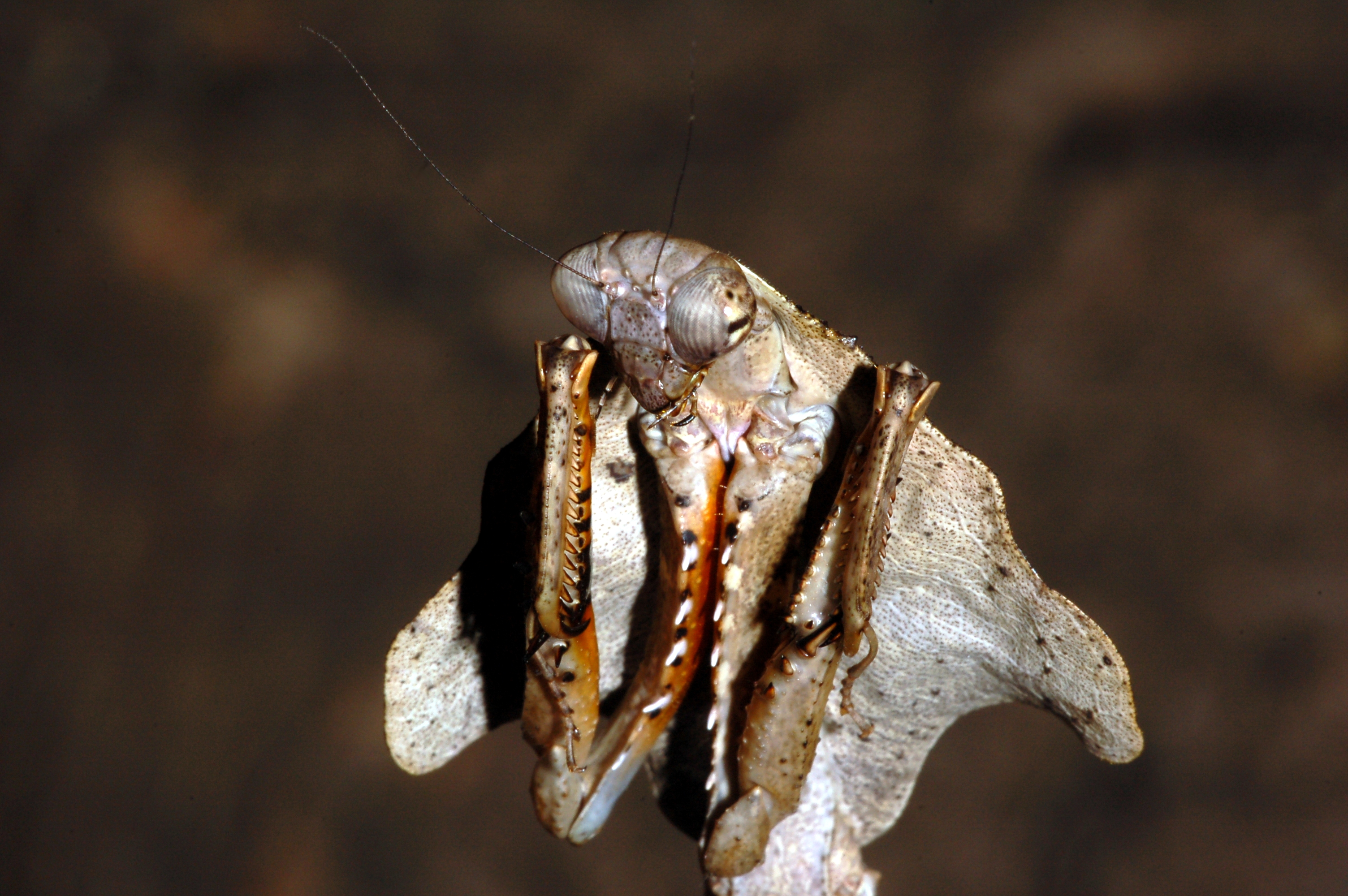
Adult female Deroplatys lobata

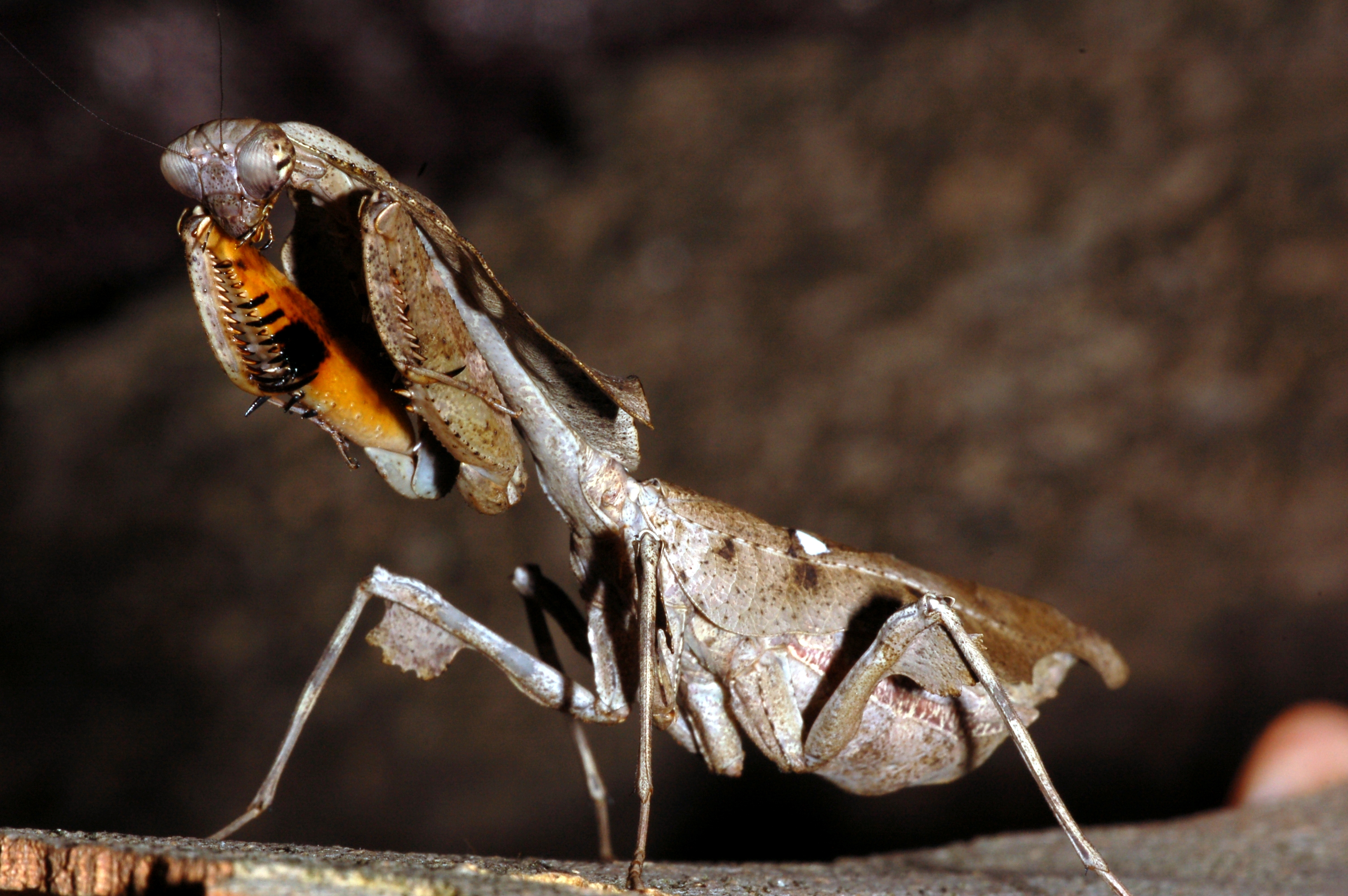
Adult female Deroplatys lobata

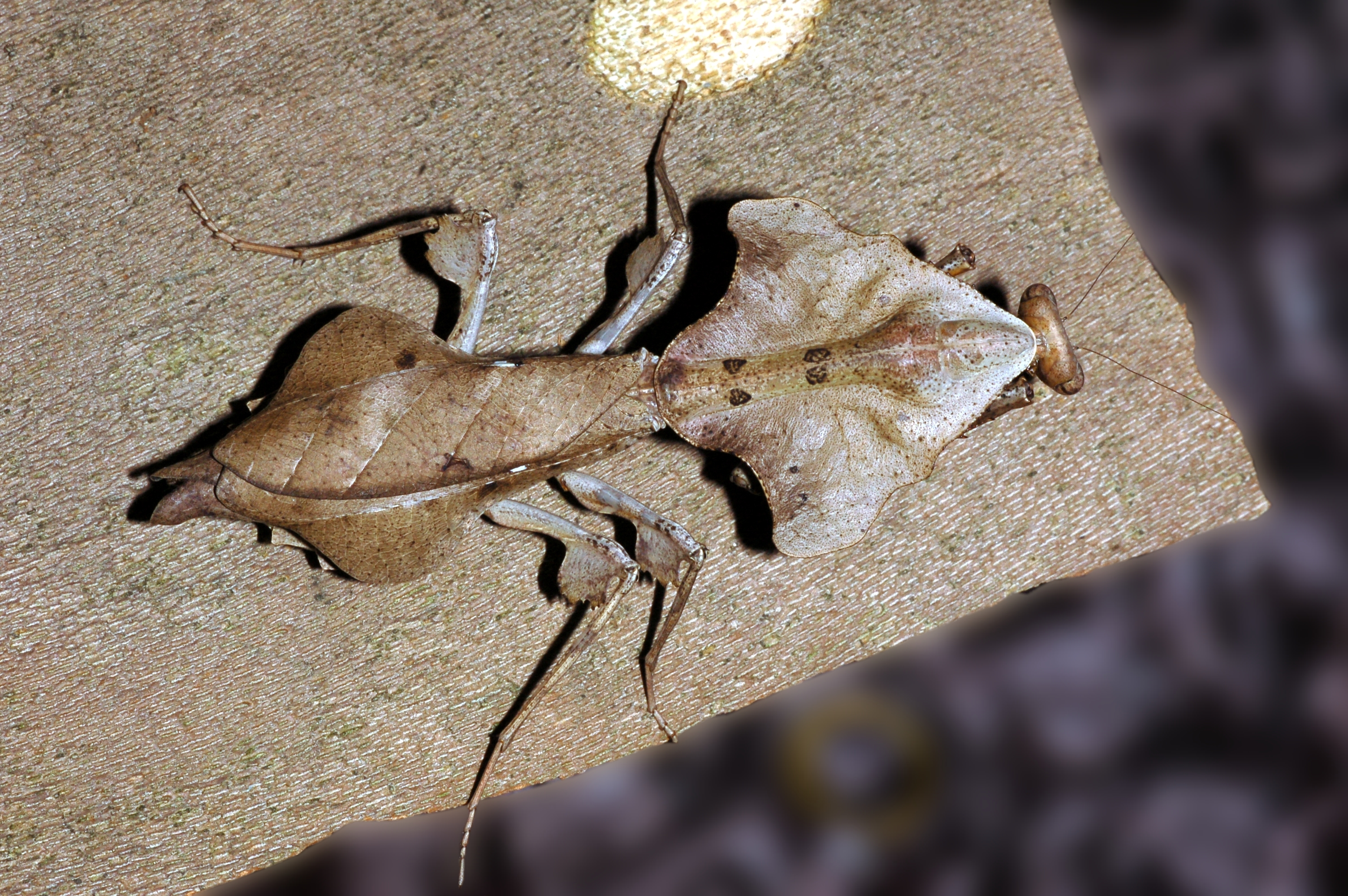
Adult female Deroplatys lobata

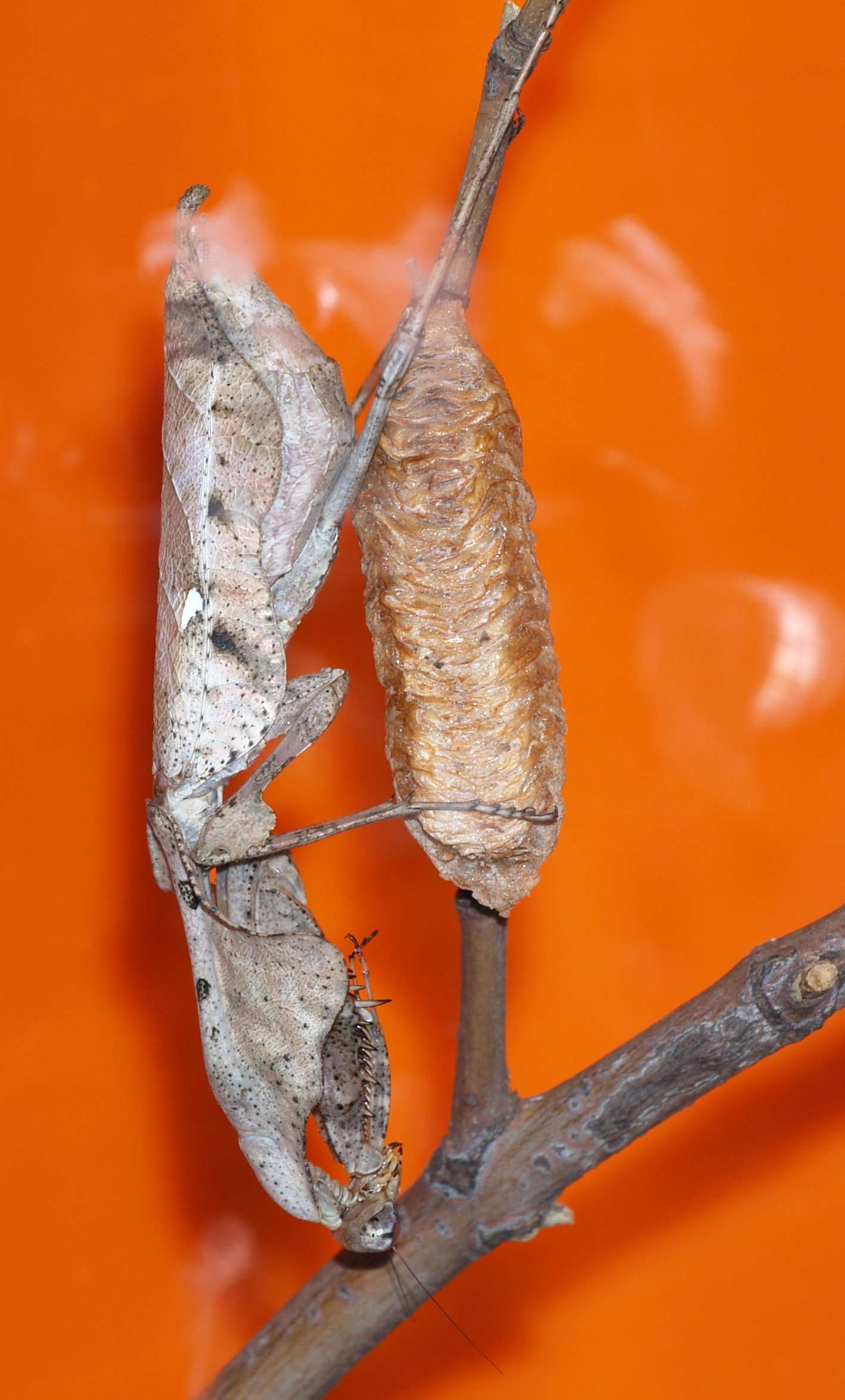
Adult female Deroplatys lobata guarding her ootheca from Cologne Zoo, Germany.

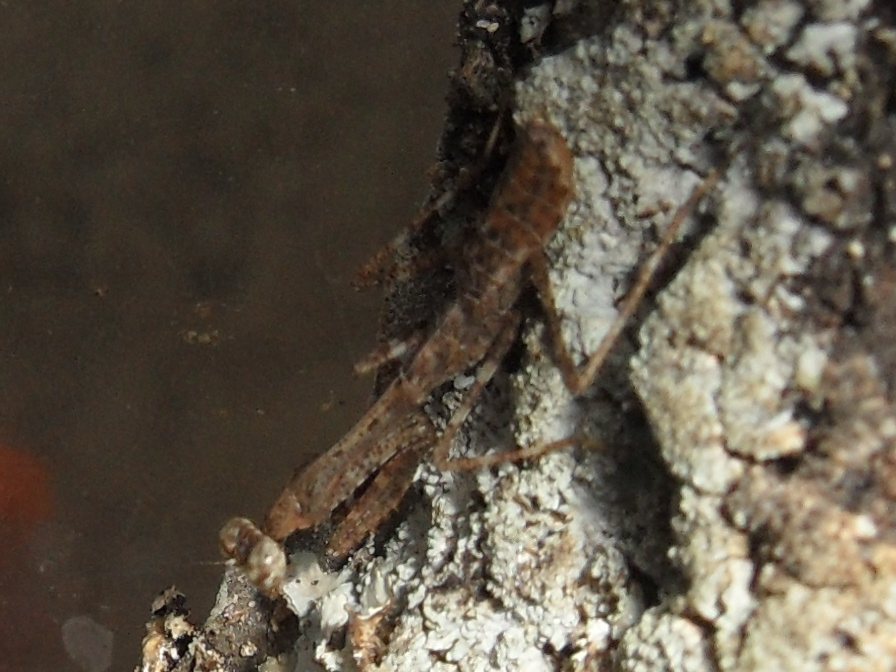
2nd instar Deroplatys lobata nymph hiding

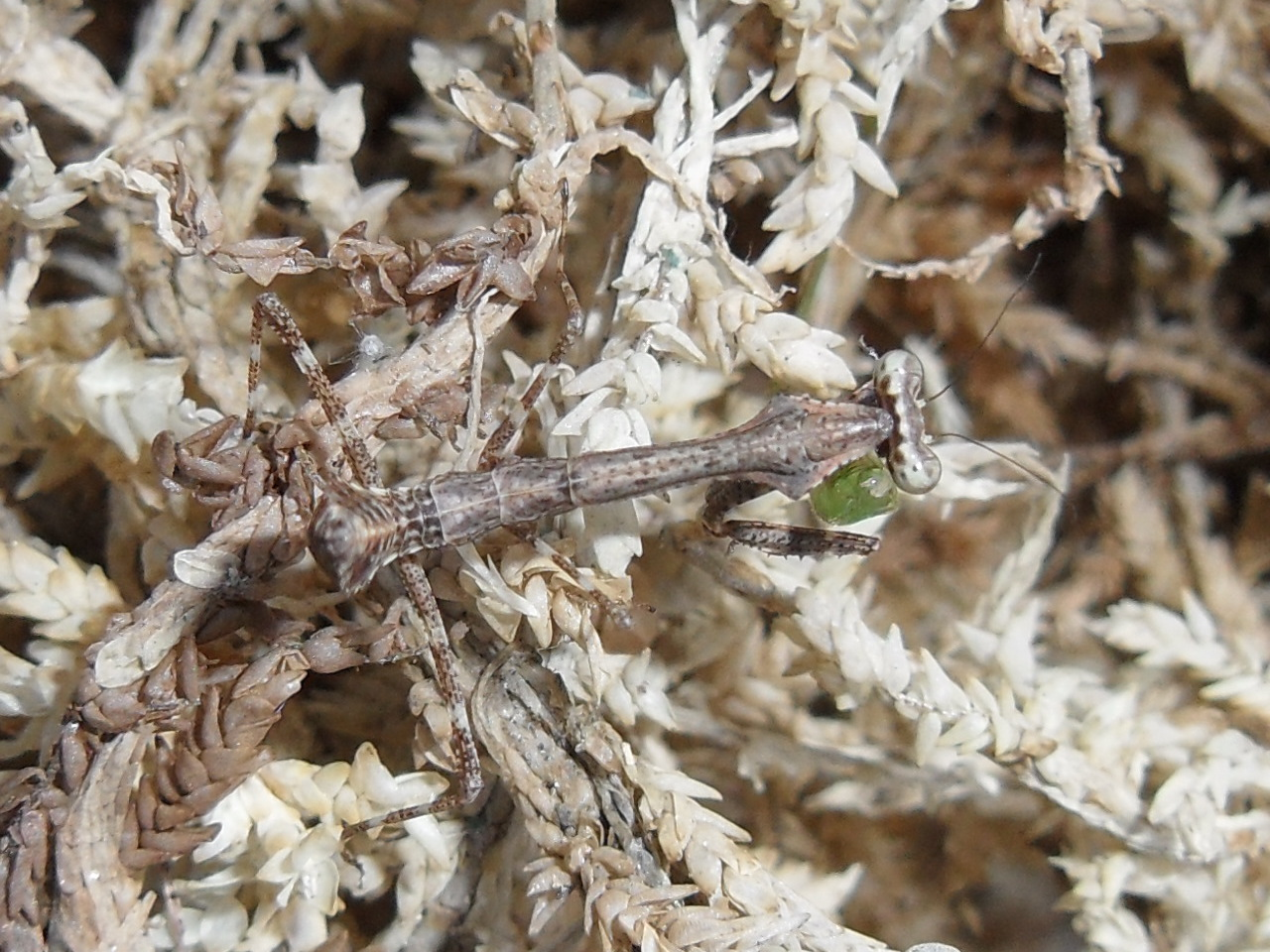
2nd instar Deroplatys lobata nymph eating

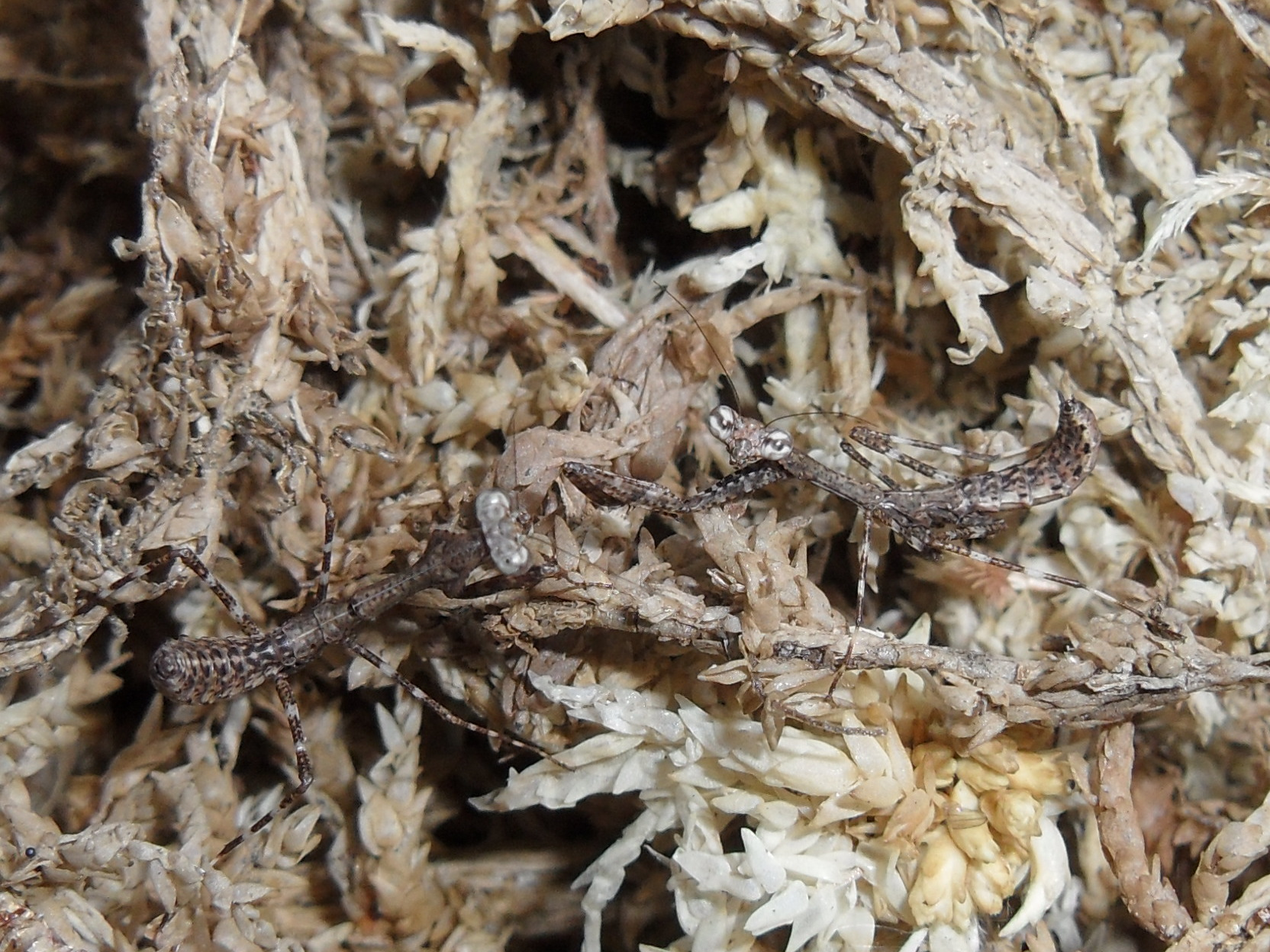
1st instar Deroplatys lobata nymphs, one on the right is hiding

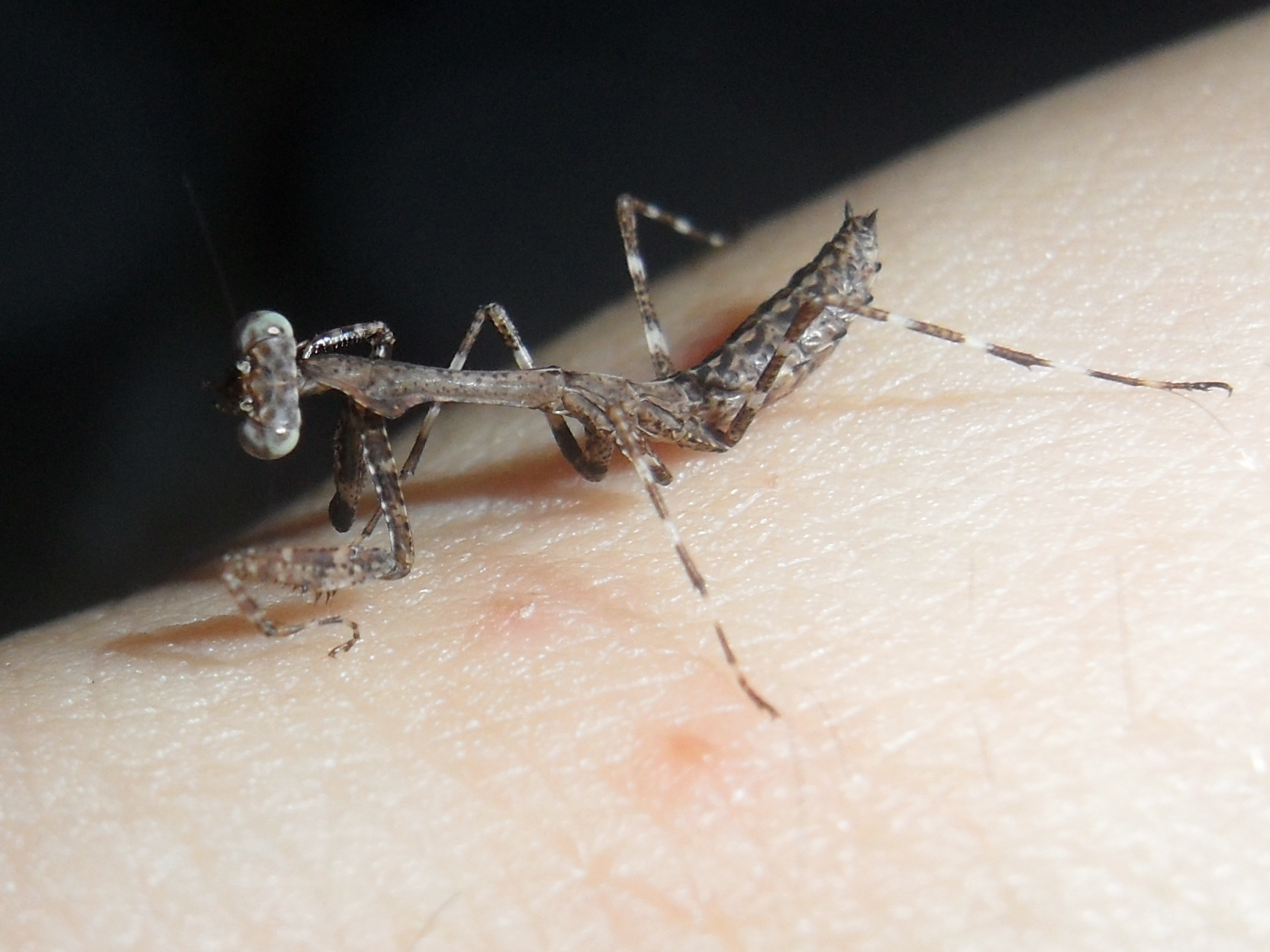
1st instar Deroplatys lobata nymph on a bedbug bitten hand

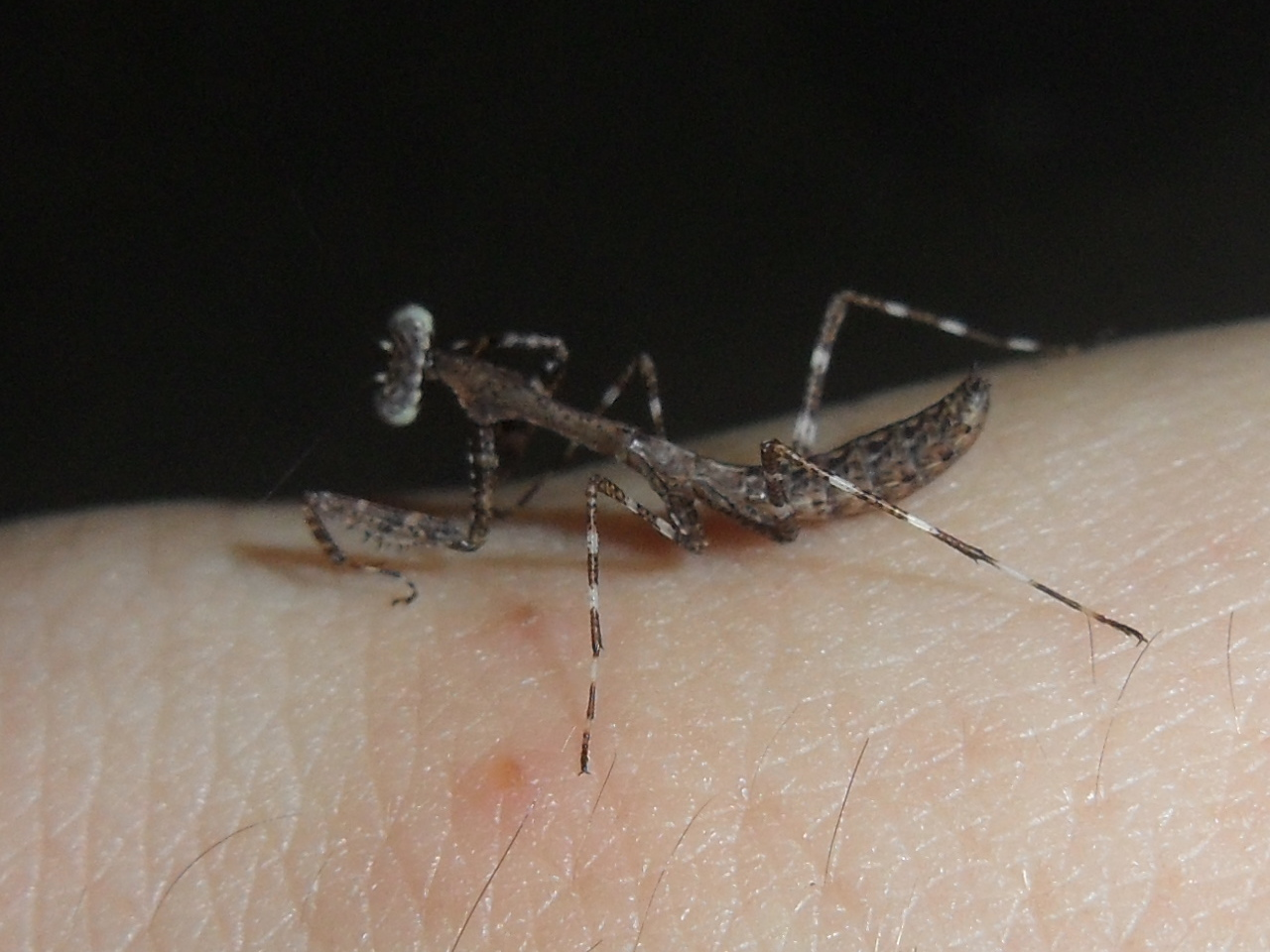
1st instar Deroplatys lobata nymph on a bedbug bitten hand

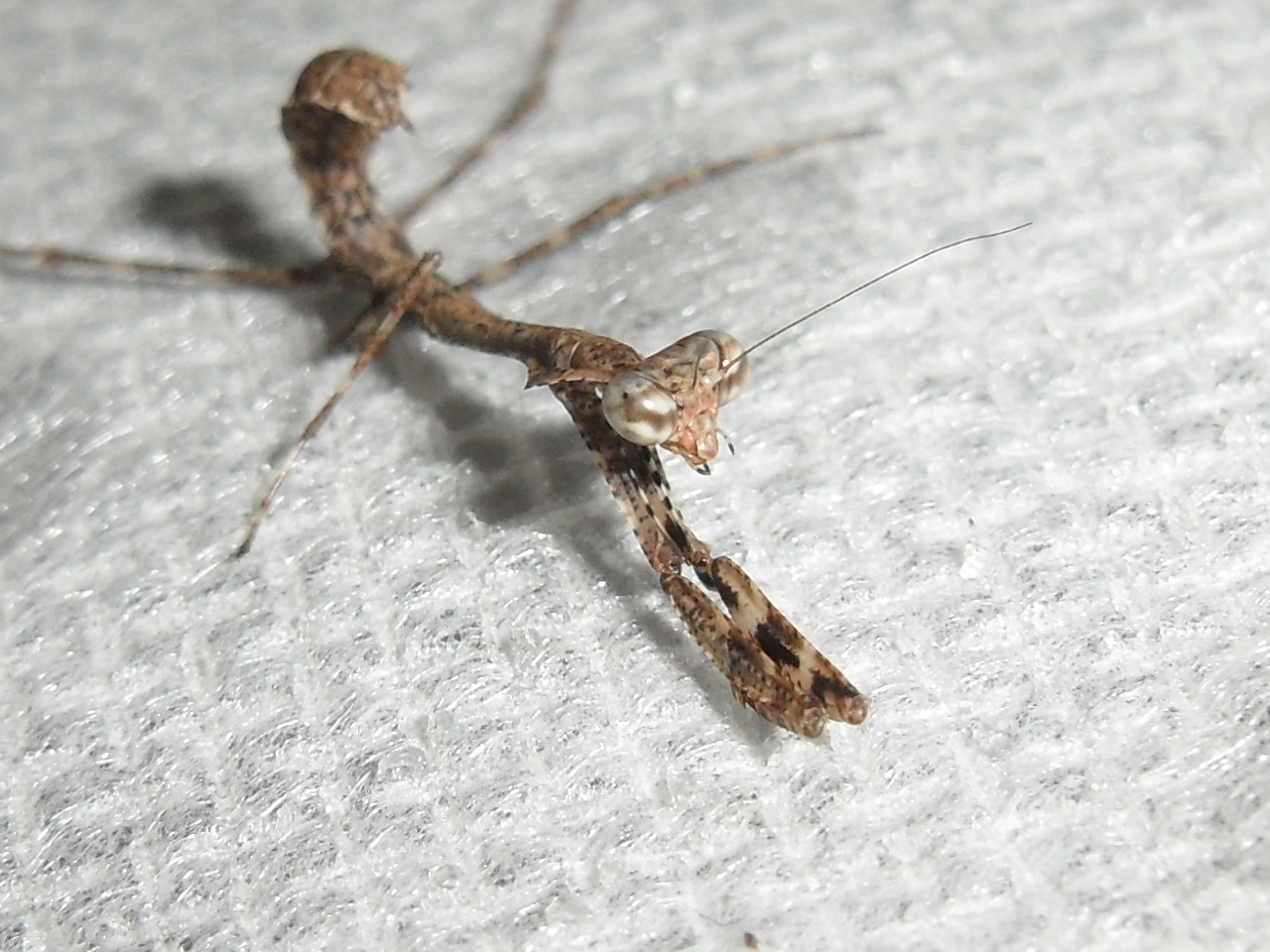
2nd instar Deroplatys lobata nymph hiding

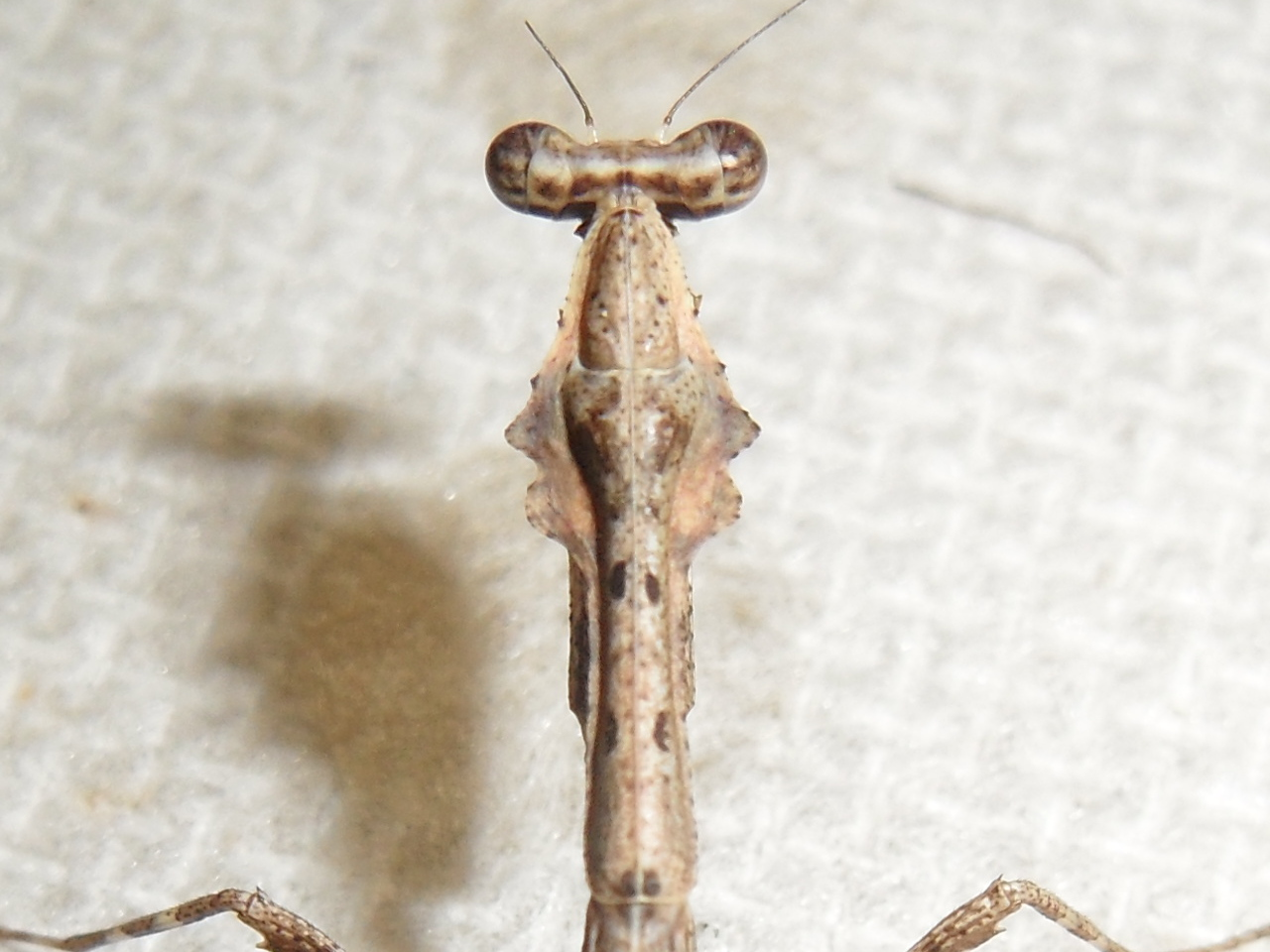
4th instar female Deroplatys lobata nymph's thorax

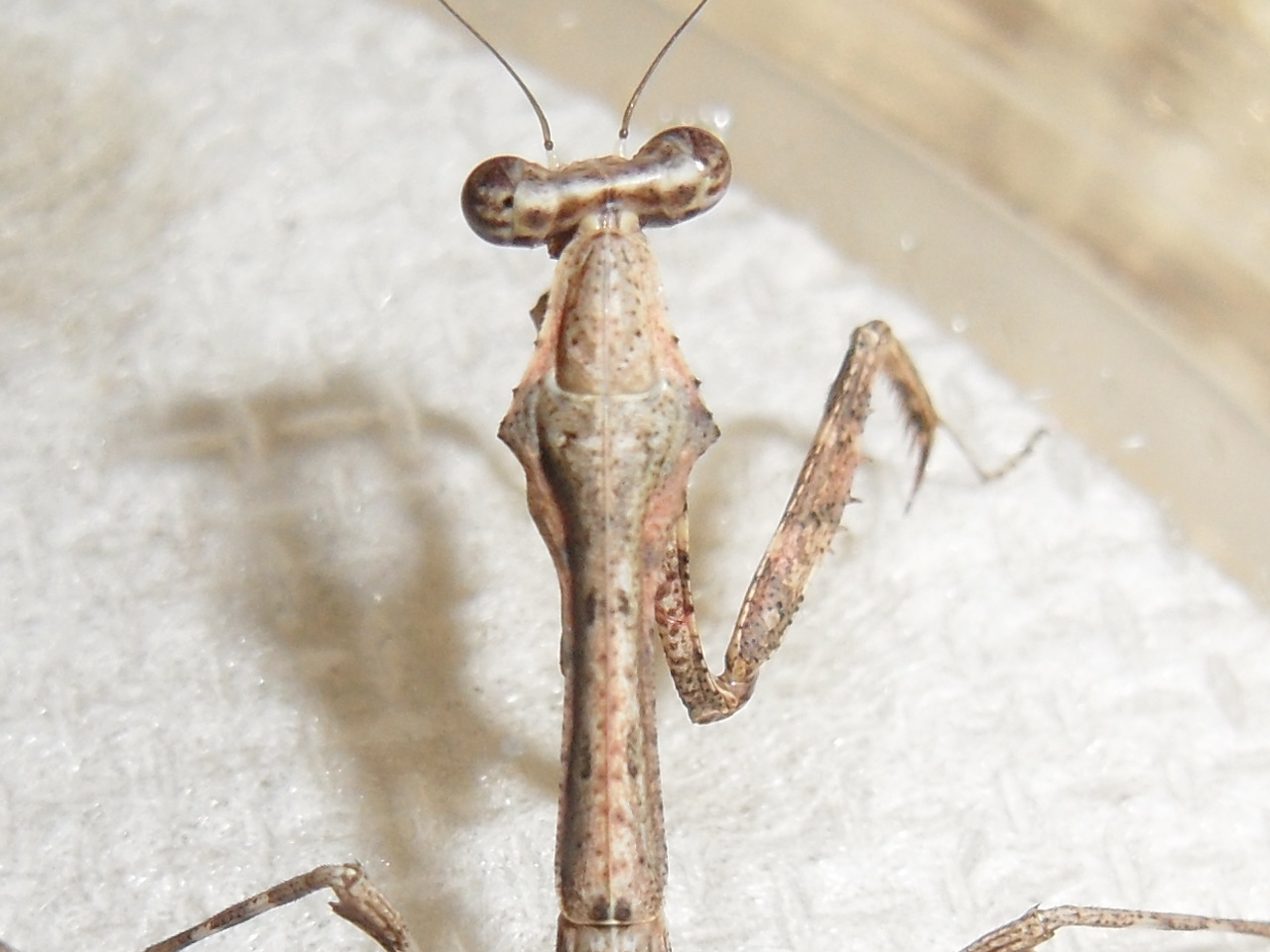
4th instar male Deroplatys lobata nymph's thorax

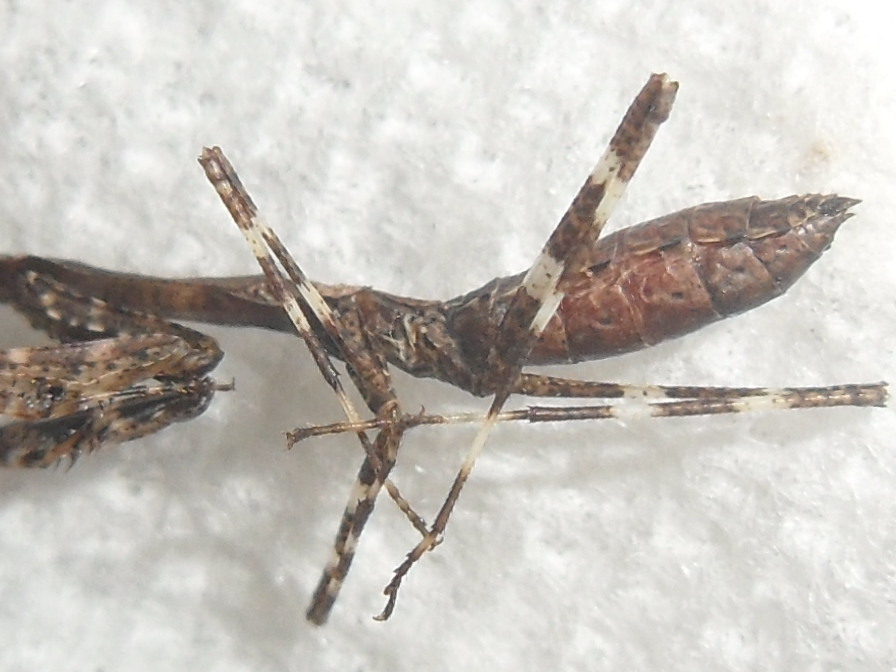
Dead 1st instar Deroplatys lobata nymph

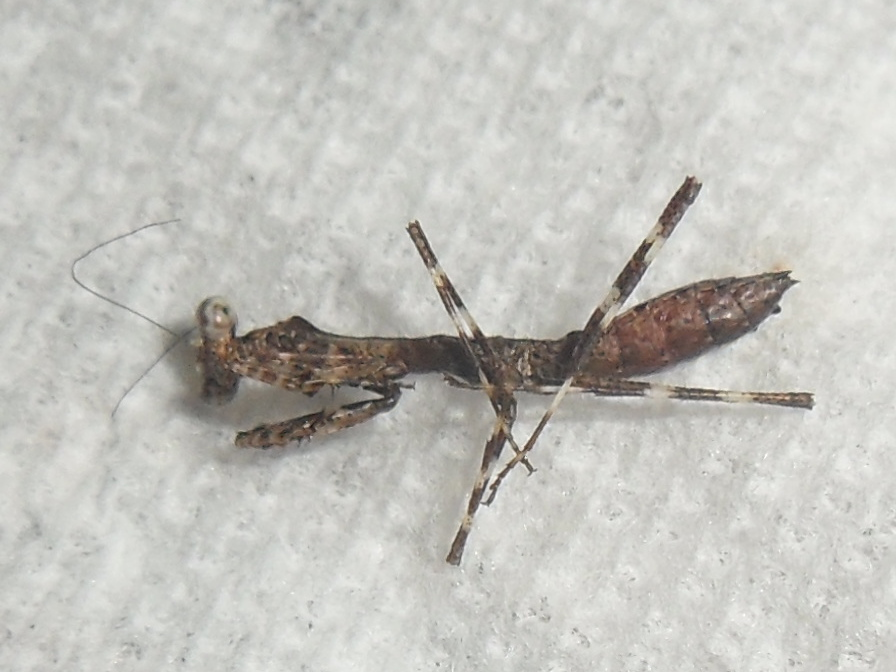
Dead 1st instar Deroplatys lobata nymph

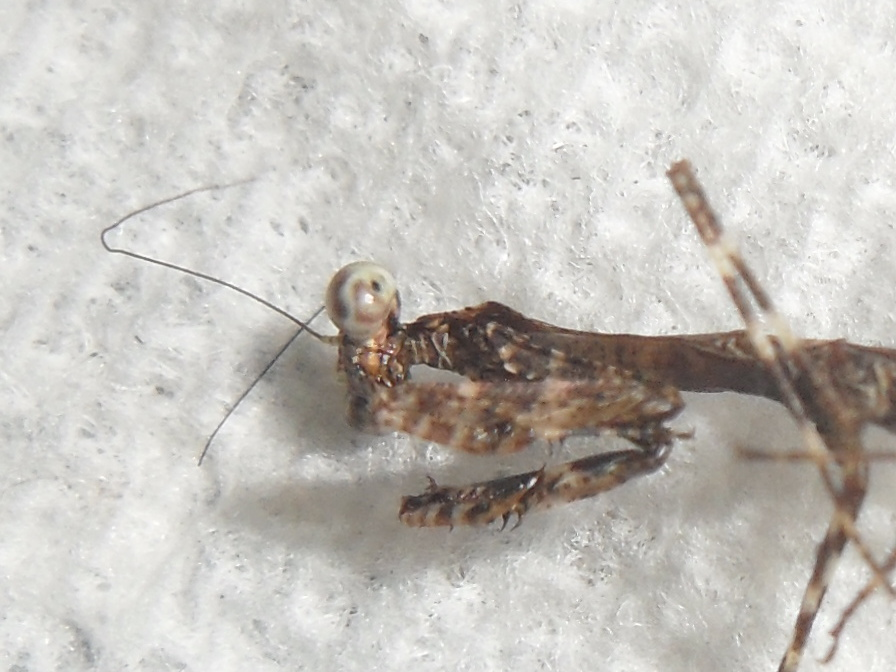
Dead 1st instar Deroplatys lobata nymph

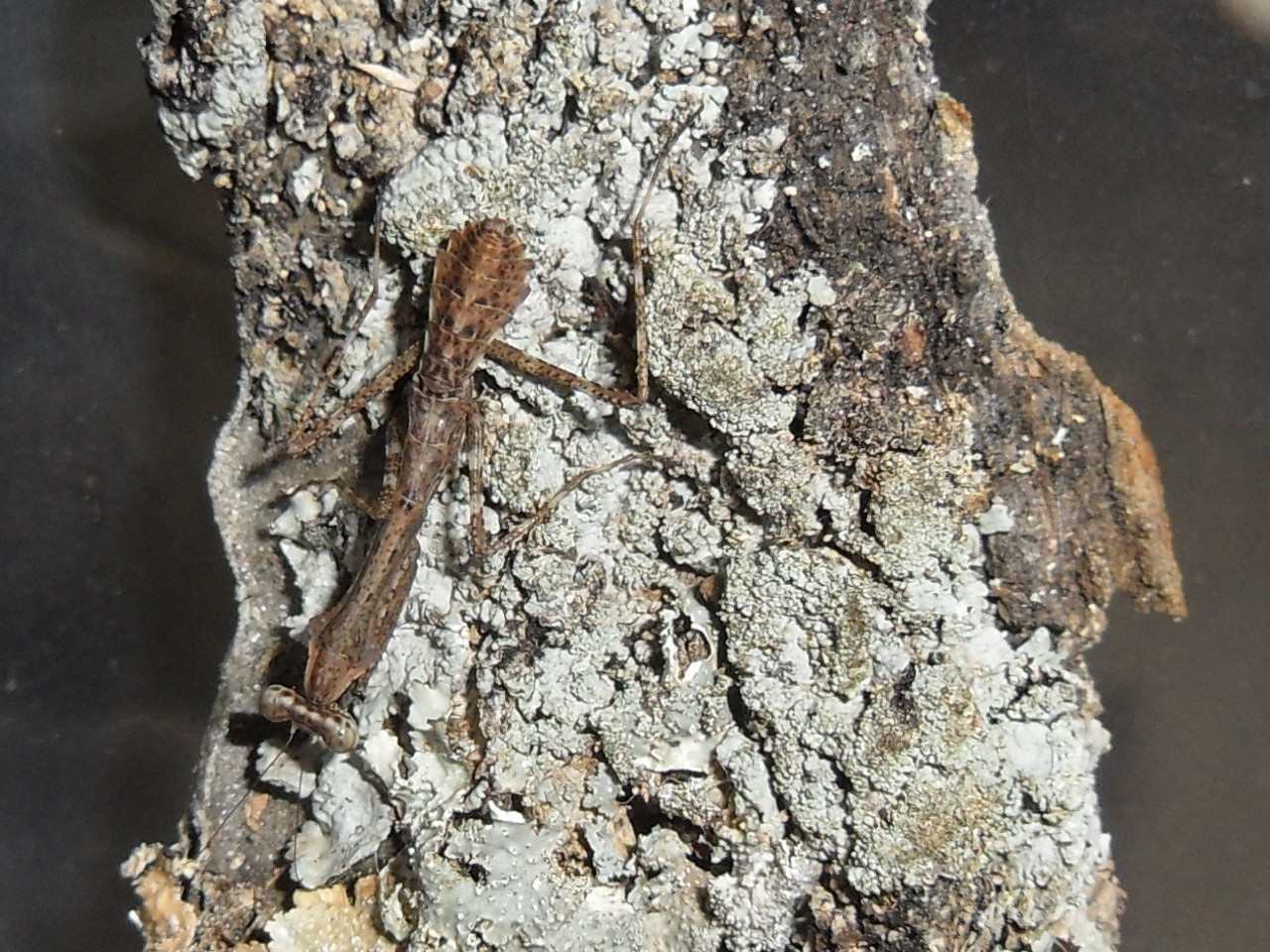
2nd instar Deroplatys lobata nymph hiding

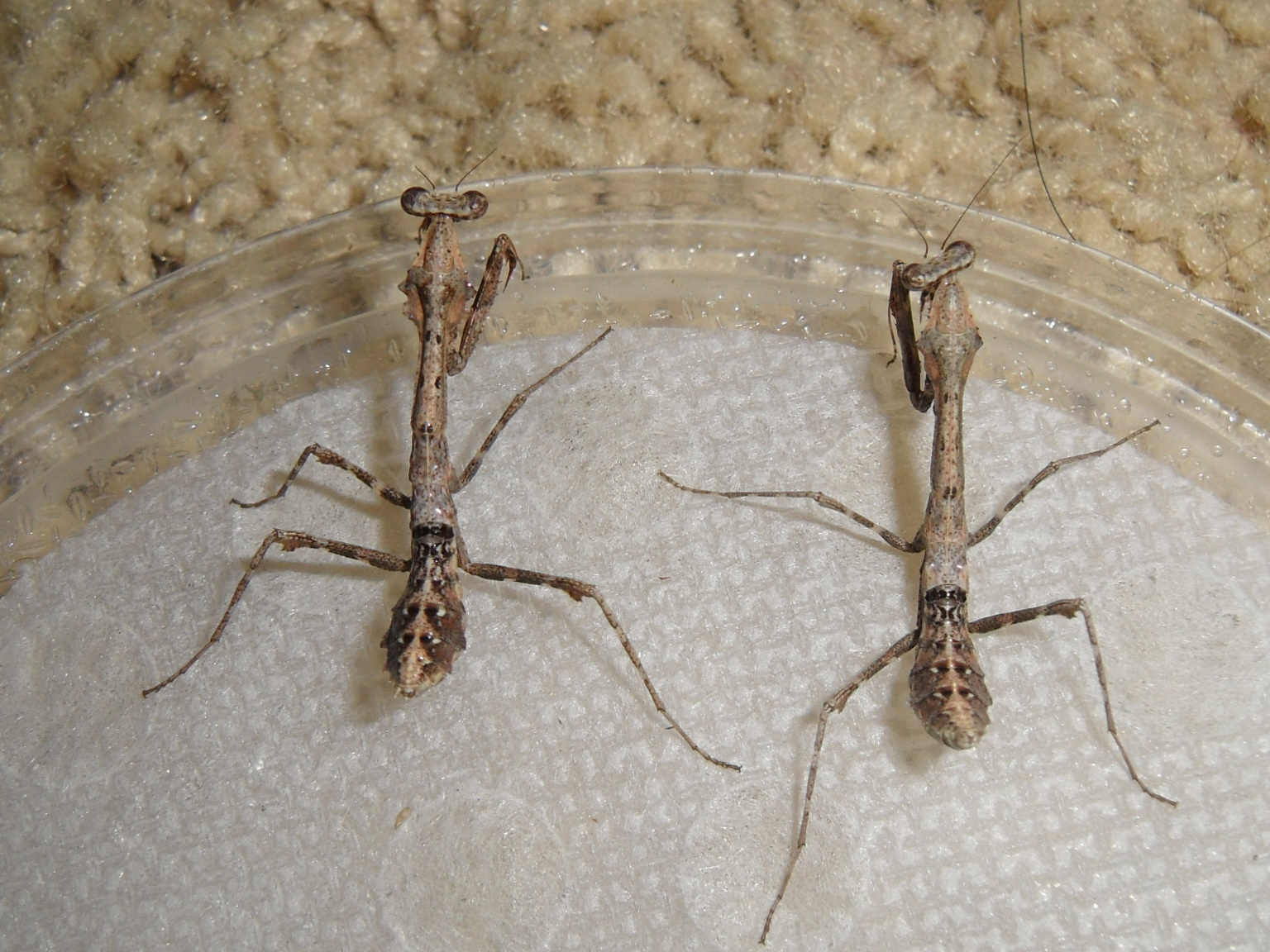
4th instar Deroplatys lobata nymphs. Female on the left and male on the right.

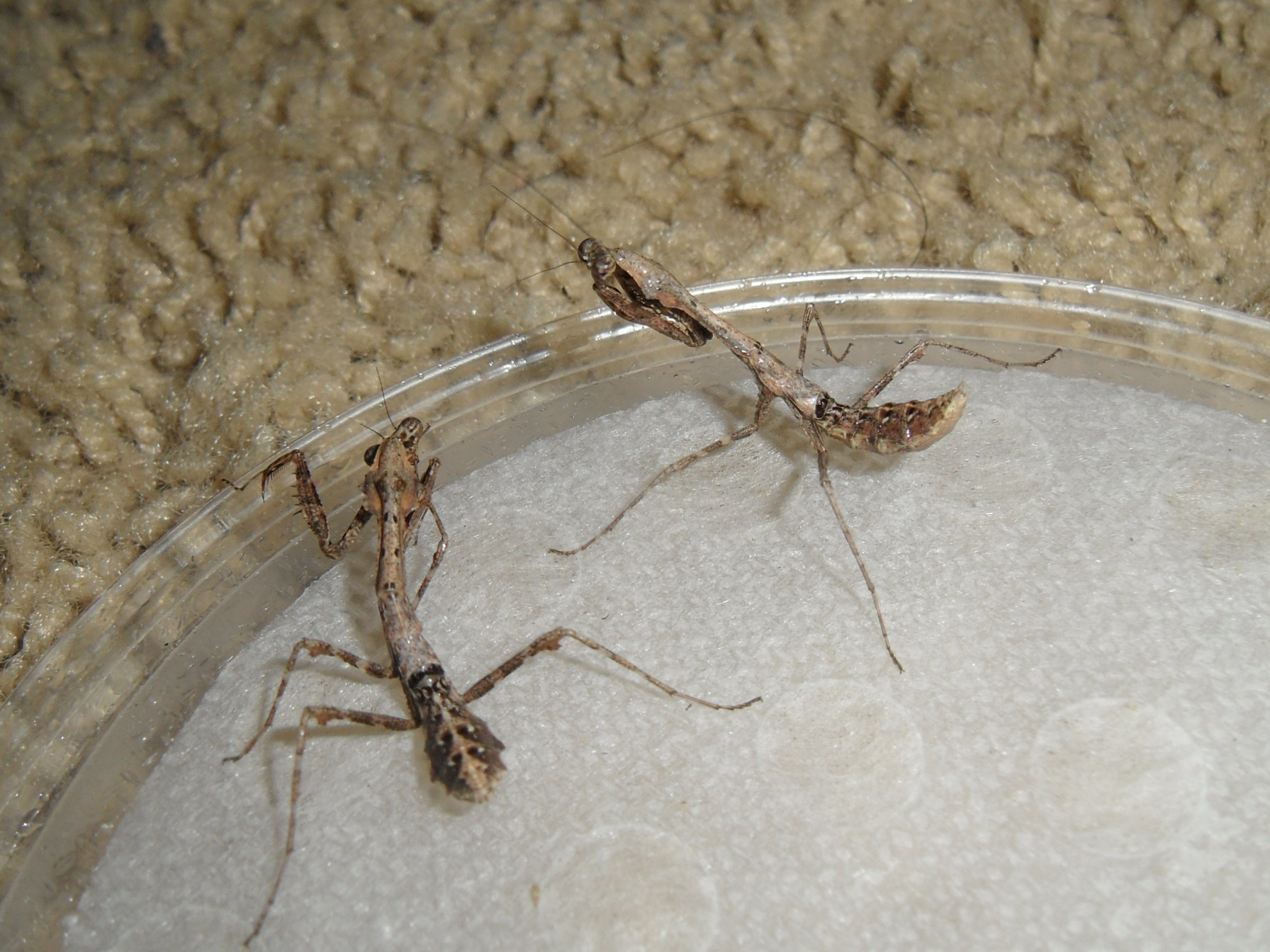
4th instar Deroplatys lobata nymphs. Female on the left and male on the right.

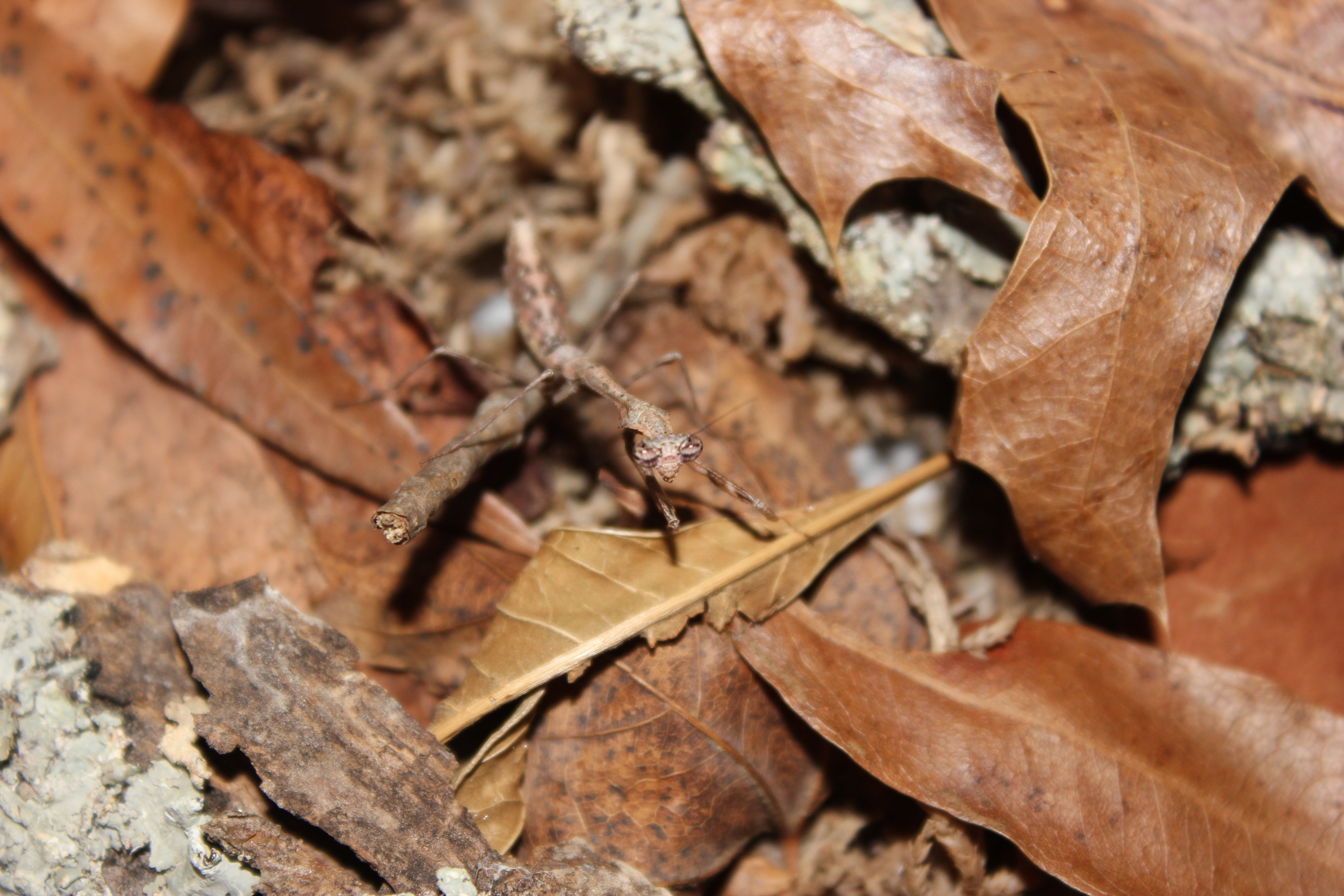
4th instar male Deroplatys lobata nymph

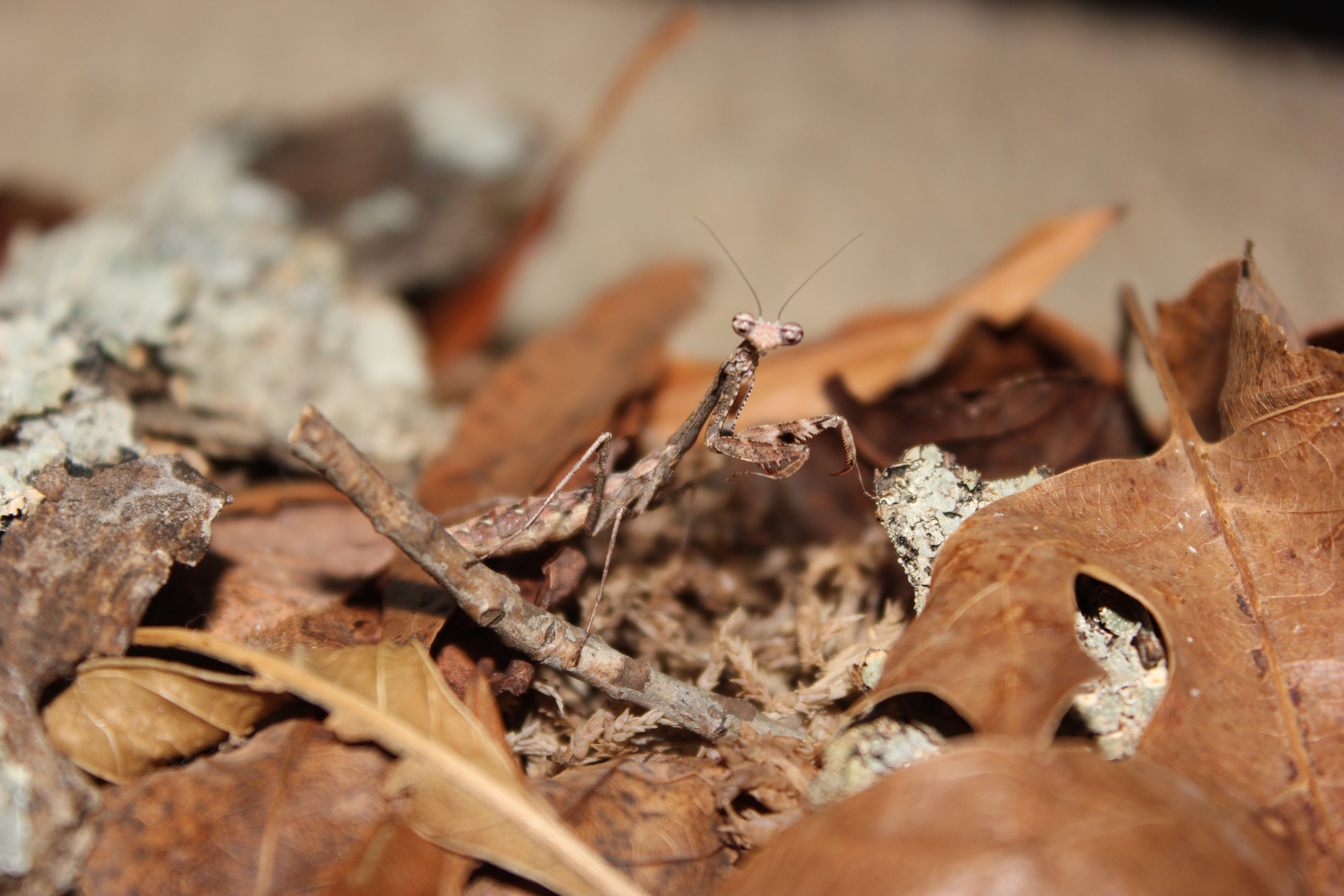
4th instar male Deroplatys lobata nymph

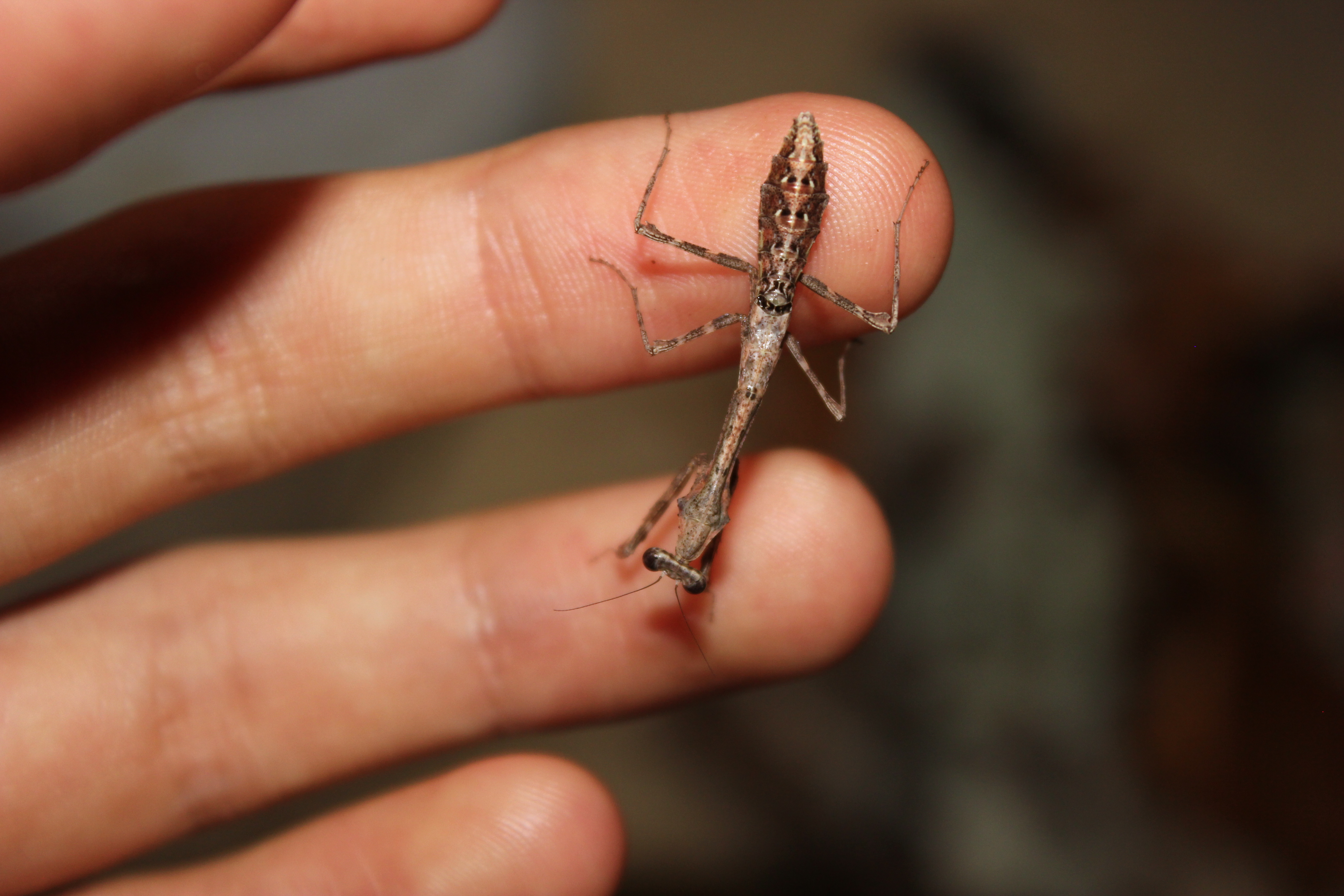
4th instar male Deroplatys lobata nymph on a finger

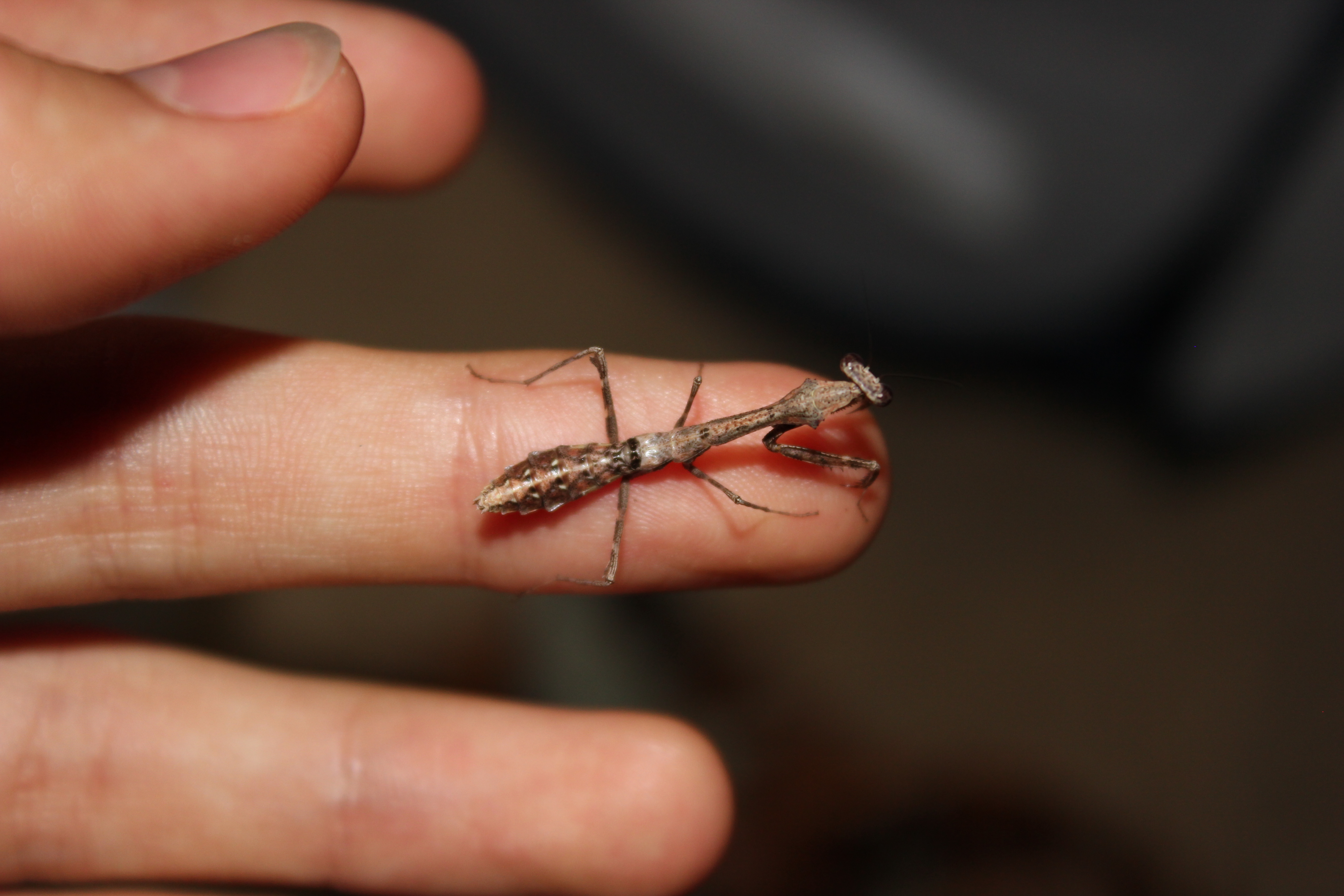
4th instar male Deroplatys lobata nymph on a finger

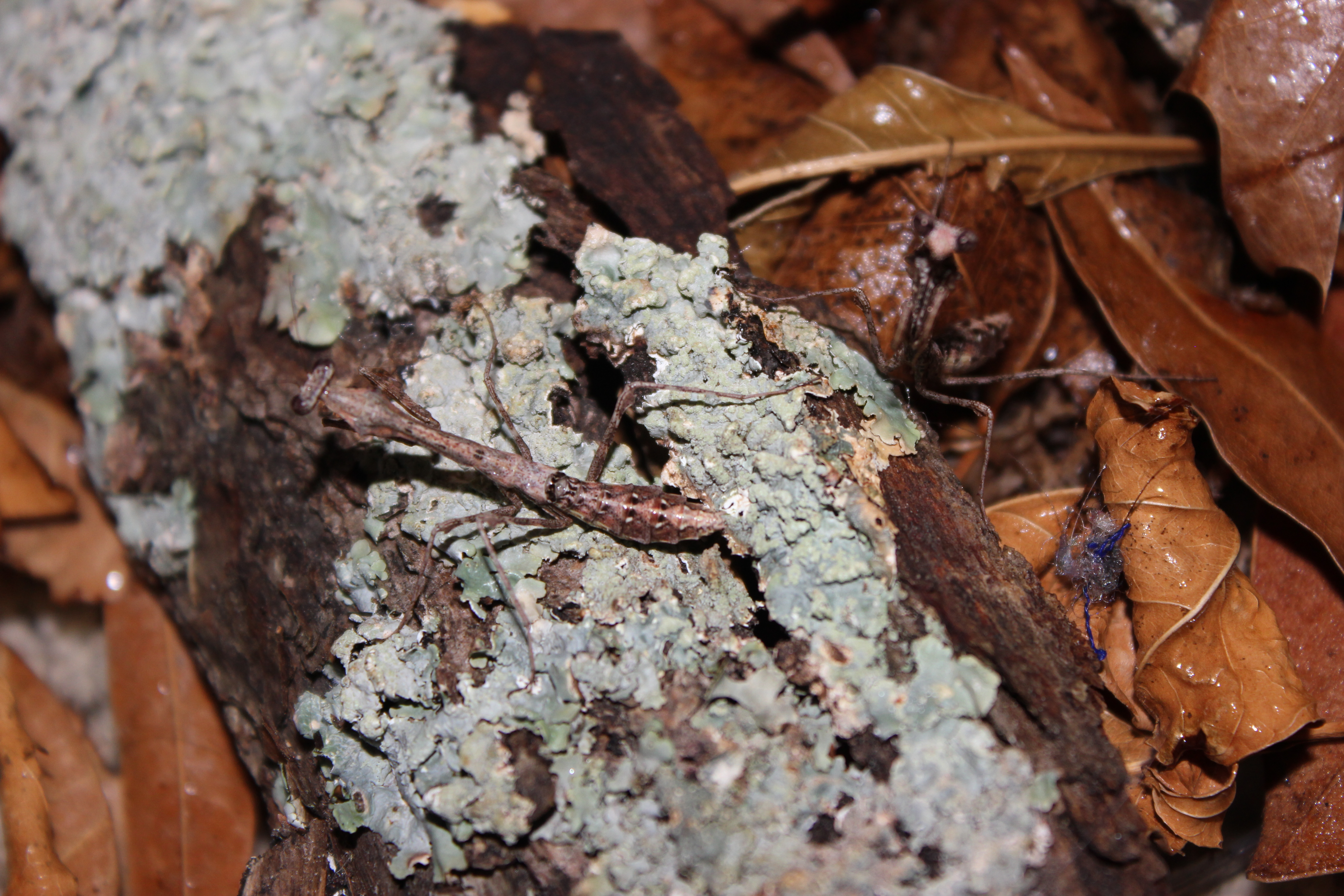
4th instar Deroplatys lobata nymphs. Female on the right, male on the left.

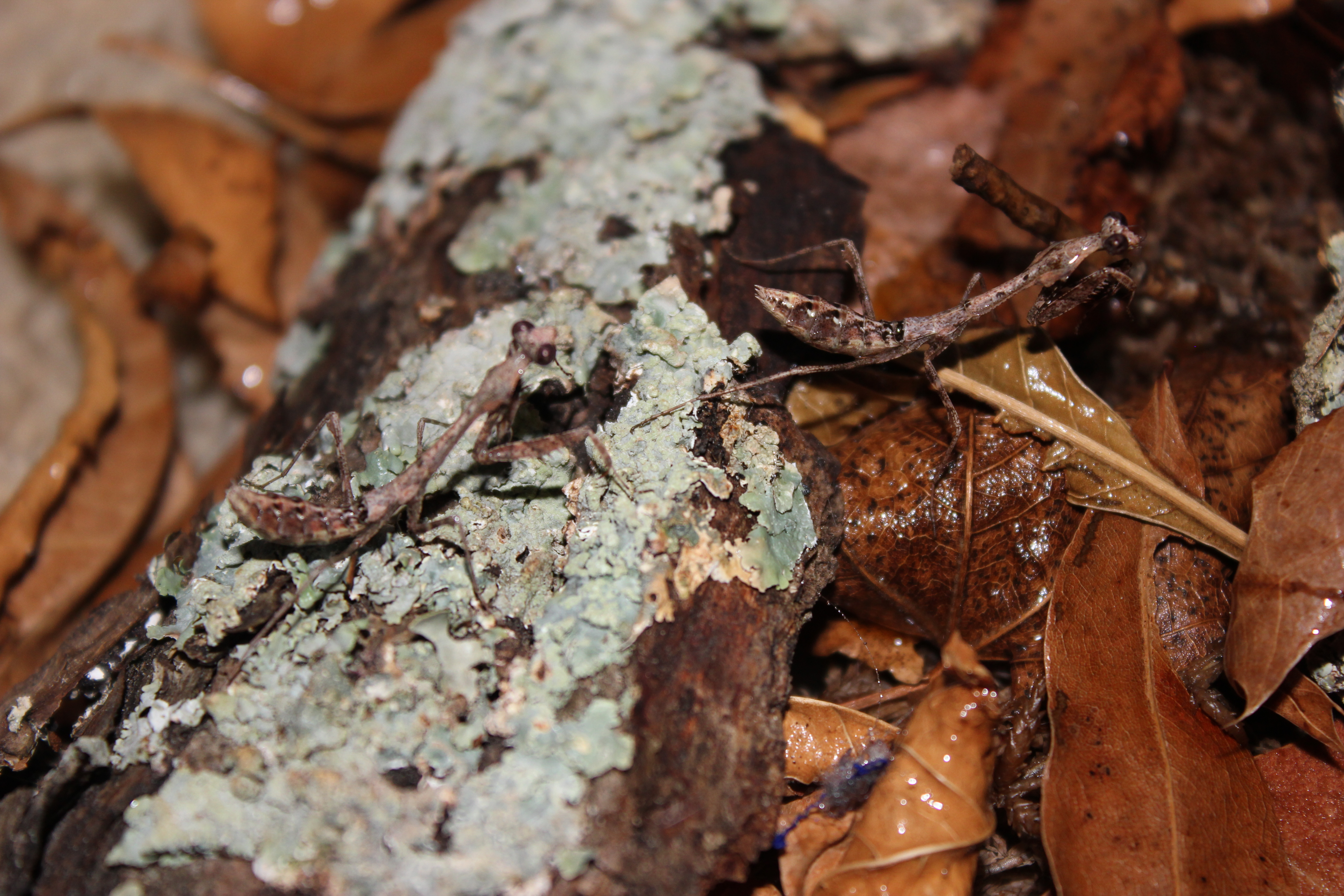
4th instar Deroplatys lobata nymphs. Female on the right, male on the left.

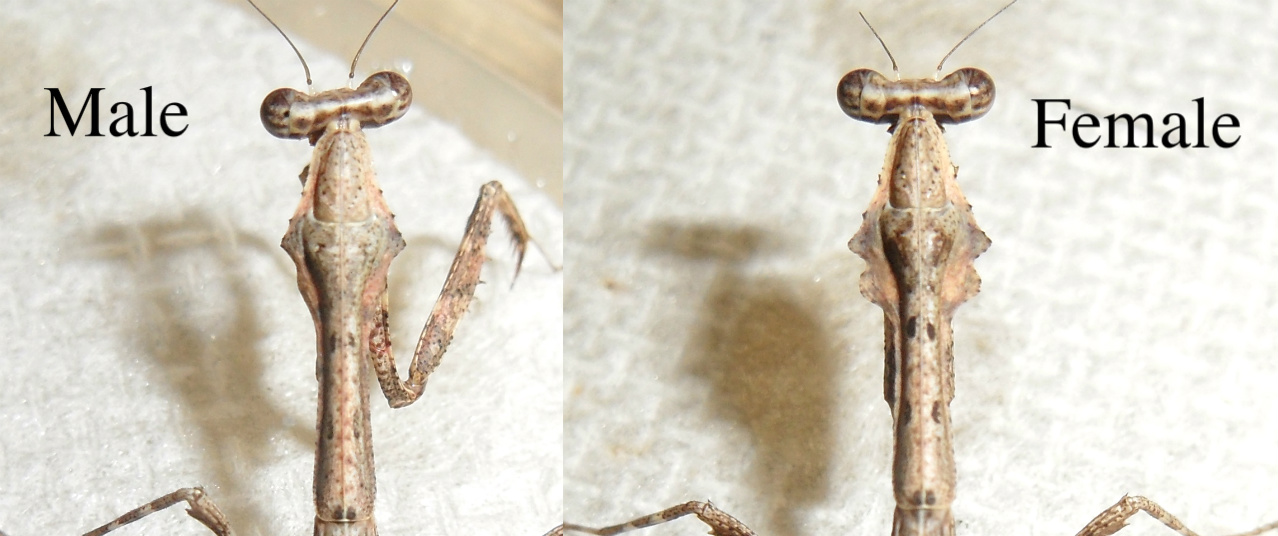
Deroplatys lobata 4th instar nymphs female and male thorax. Male on the left and female on the right.

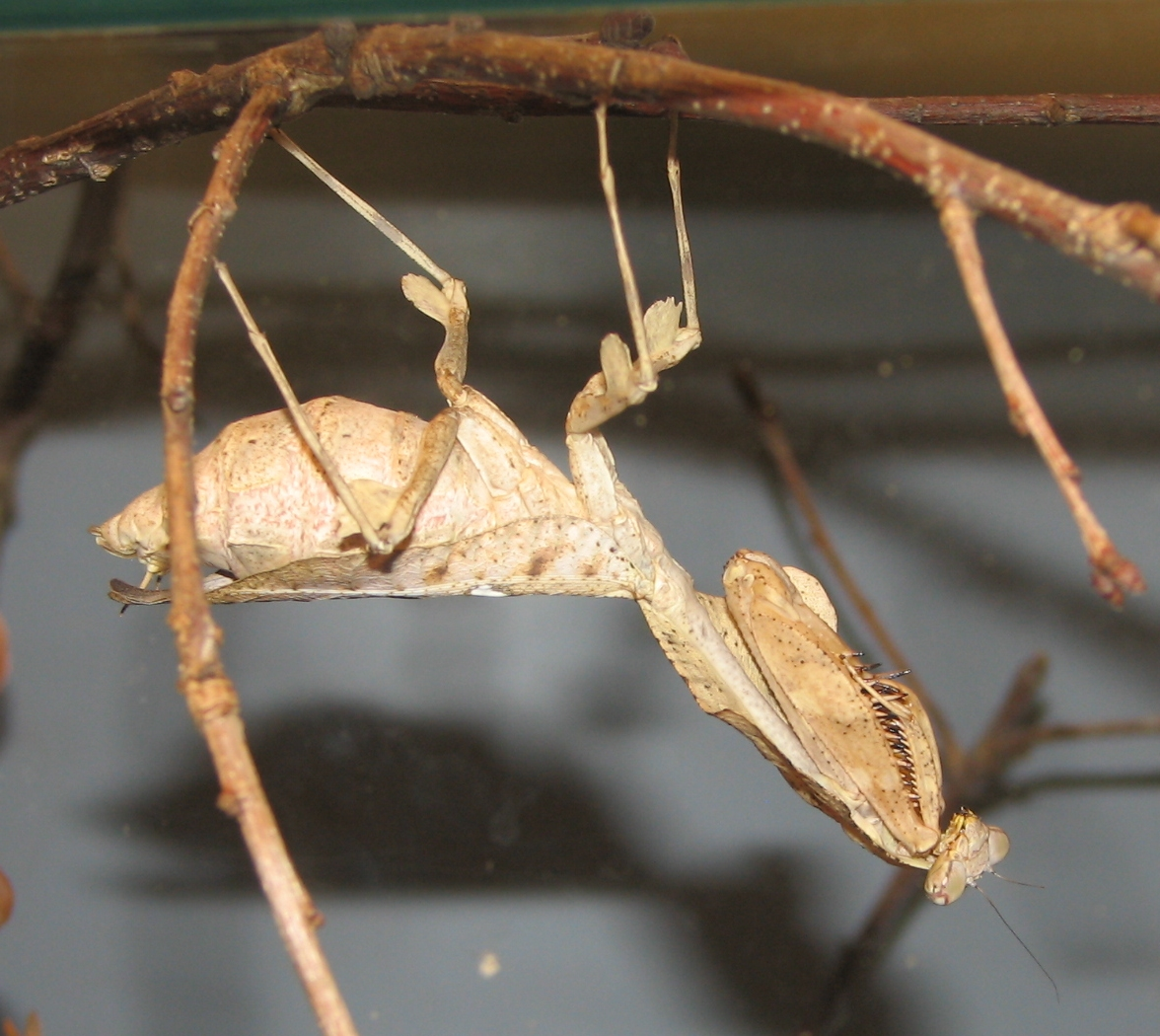
Adult female Deroplatys lobata

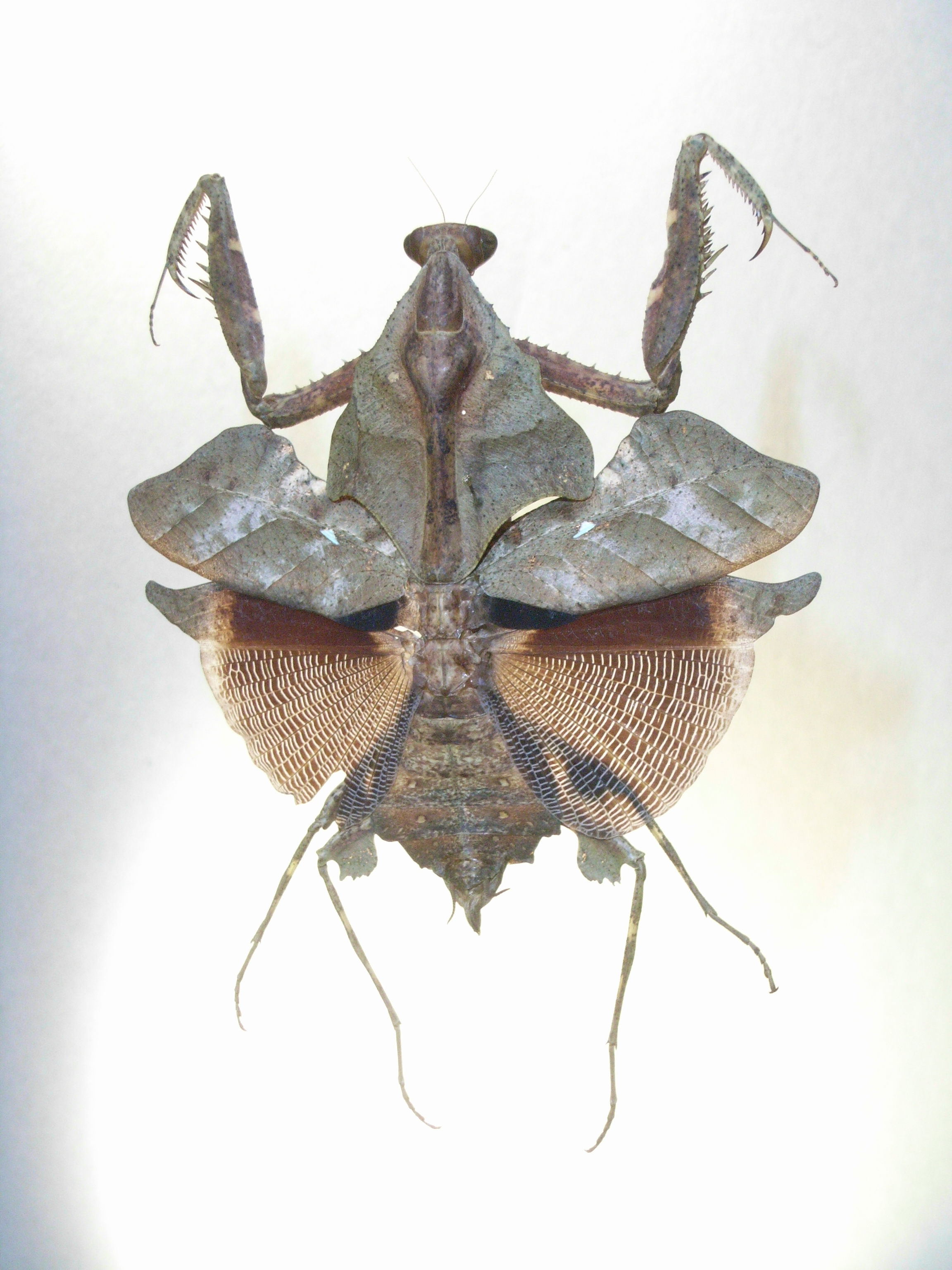
Dead adult female Deroplatys lobata

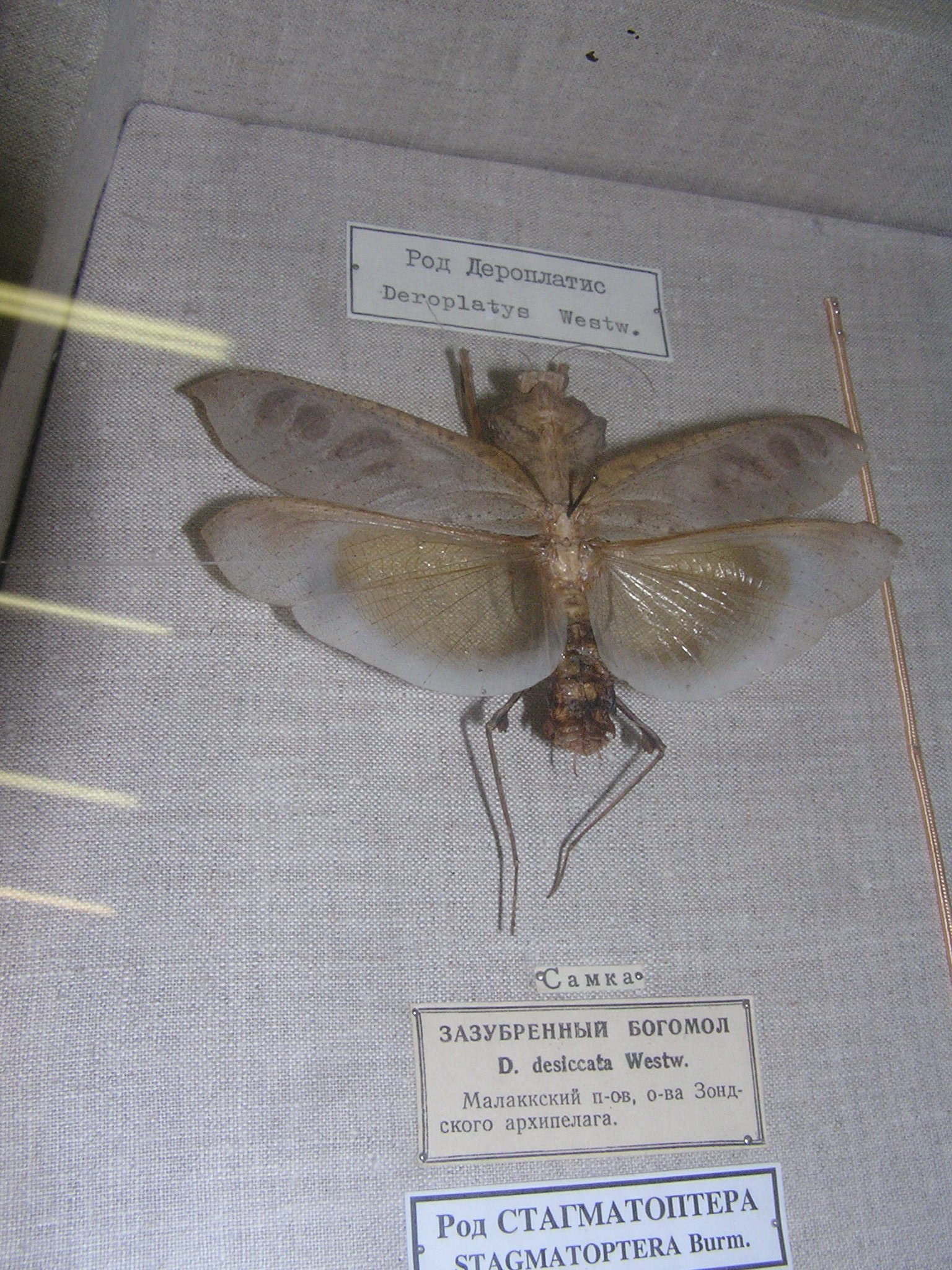
Dead adult male Deroplatys desiccata

== See also ==
- List of mantis genera and species
