= Deroplatys philippinica =

Scientific classification
- Kingdom: Animalia
- Phylum: Arthropoda
- Clade: Pancrustacea
- Class: Insecta
- Order: Mantodea
- Family: Deroplatyidae
- Genus: Deroplatys
- Species: D. philippinica

Binomial name
- Deroplatys philippinica Werner, 1922

Species of praying mantis

Deroplatys philippinica, with the common name Philippines dead leaf mantis, is a species of dead leaf mantis.

It is endemic to the Philippines.

== See also ==
- Mantises of Southeast Asia
- List of mantis genera and species
