= Acanthops royi =

Scientific classification
- Kingdom: Animalia
- Phylum: Arthropoda
- Clade: Pancrustacea
- Class: Insecta
- Order: Mantodea
- Family: Acanthopidae
- Genus: Acanthops
- Species: A. royi

Binomial name
- Acanthops royi Lombardo & Ippolito, 2004

Species of praying mantis

Acanthops royi is a species of praying mantis in the family Acanthopidae and is one of many mantis from various genera that resembles a dead leaf.

== See also ==
- Dead leaf mantis
- List of mantis genera and species
