= Acanthops centralis =

Scientific classification
- Kingdom: Animalia
- Phylum: Arthropoda
- Clade: Pancrustacea
- Class: Insecta
- Order: Mantodea
- Family: Acanthopidae
- Genus: Acanthops
- Species: A. centralis

Binomial name
- Acanthops centralis Lombardo & Ippolito, 2004

Species of insect

Acanthops centralis, the central acanthops, is a species of praying mantis in the family Acanthopidae. It is found in Costa Rica, Panama, and Colombia.

== See also ==
- Dead leaf mantis
- List of mantis genera and species
