= Acanthops boliviana =

Scientific classification
- Kingdom: Animalia
- Phylum: Arthropoda
- Clade: Pancrustacea
- Class: Insecta
- Order: Mantodea
- Family: Acanthopidae
- Genus: Acanthops
- Species: A. boliviana

Binomial name
- Acanthops boliviana Chopard, 1916

Species of insect

Acanthops boliviana, the Bolivian acanthops, is a species of praying mantis in the family Acanthopidae.

== Discovery ==
- This species was described by Chopard in 1916.

== Distribution ==
Acanthops boliviana is found in Bolivia.

== See also ==
- Dead leaf mantis
- List of mantis genera and species
