= Acanthops coloradensis =

Scientific classification
- Kingdom: Animalia
- Phylum: Arthropoda
- Clade: Pancrustacea
- Class: Insecta
- Order: Mantodea
- Family: Acanthopidae
- Genus: Acanthops
- Species: A. coloradensis

Binomial name
- Acanthops coloradensis González, Miller & J Salazar, 2011

Species of praying mantis

Acanthops coloradensis, the Ecuatorian acanthops, is a species of praying mantis in the family Acanthopidae.

== Distribution ==
It is observed in Taracoa, Ecuador.

== See also ==
- Dead leaf mantis
- List of mantis genera and species
