= Acanthops bidens =

Scientific classification
- Kingdom: Animalia
- Phylum: Arthropoda
- Clade: Pancrustacea
- Class: Insecta
- Order: Mantodea
- Family: Acanthopidae
- Genus: Acanthops
- Species: A. bidens

Binomial name
- Acanthops bidens Hebard, 1922

Species of praying mantis

Acanthops bidens is a species of mantis in the family Acanthopidae.

== Discovery ==
- This species was described by Morgan Hebard in 1922.

== Distribution ==
Acanthops bidens is native to Mexico.
