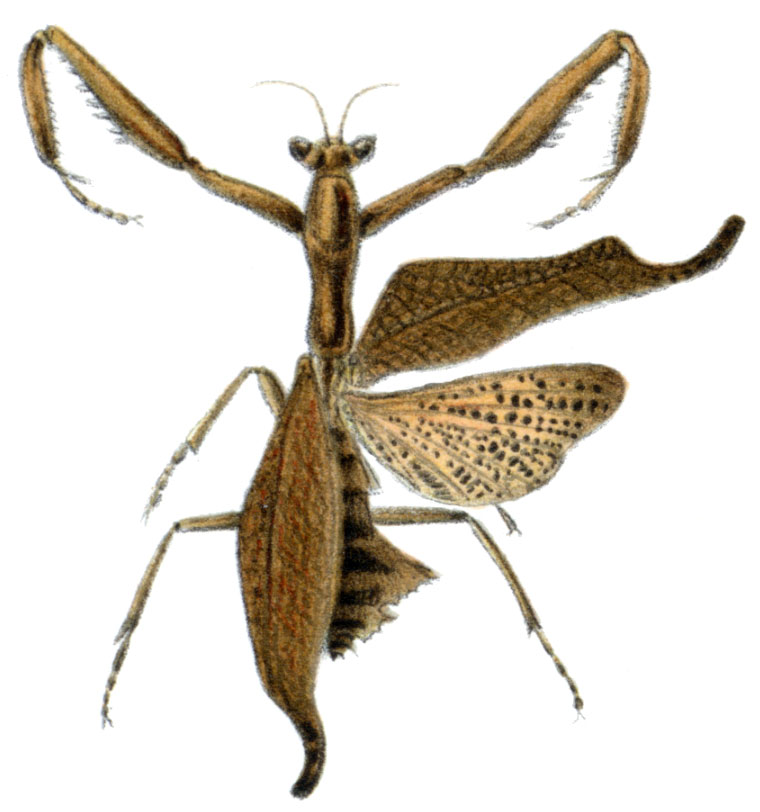
- Adult female Acanthops falcataria

Scientific classification
- Kingdom: Animalia
- Phylum: Arthropoda
- Clade: Pancrustacea
- Class: Insecta
- Order: Mantodea
- Family: Acanthopidae
- Tribe: Acanthopini
- Genus: Acanthops; Serville, 1831

Species
- 20 species (see text)

= Acanthops =

Genus of praying mantises

Acanthops is a genus of mantises in the family Acanthopidae, containing 20 species that can be found in Central and South America.

== Description ==
Most species in Acanthops are colloquially referred to as the dead leaf mantis, a common name also used for species in several other mantid genera.

Acanthops species have an unusual degree of sexual dimorphism compared to other mantids. The flightless female resembles a curled dead leaf folded back on itself, and weighs twice as much as the males do. It has reduced wings that can be raised to reveal bright warning colors on the abdomen. The male has long functional wings that resemble a flat or rolled-up dead leaf at rest. When perched, males often assume a posture where the head, grasping legs and prothorax add to the camouflage effect by recreating the appearance of a dead leaf's shriveled petiole and stipules.

== Etymology ==
The genus name comes from Ancient Greek ἄκανθα (ákantha), meaning "spine", and ὅψ (óps), meaning "eye", referring to the presence of a shorter or longer conical tubercle on top of each eye in all Acanthops species. Note that such ocular tubercles also occur in various other mantid genera.

== Taxonomy ==
The following species are currently considered valid:

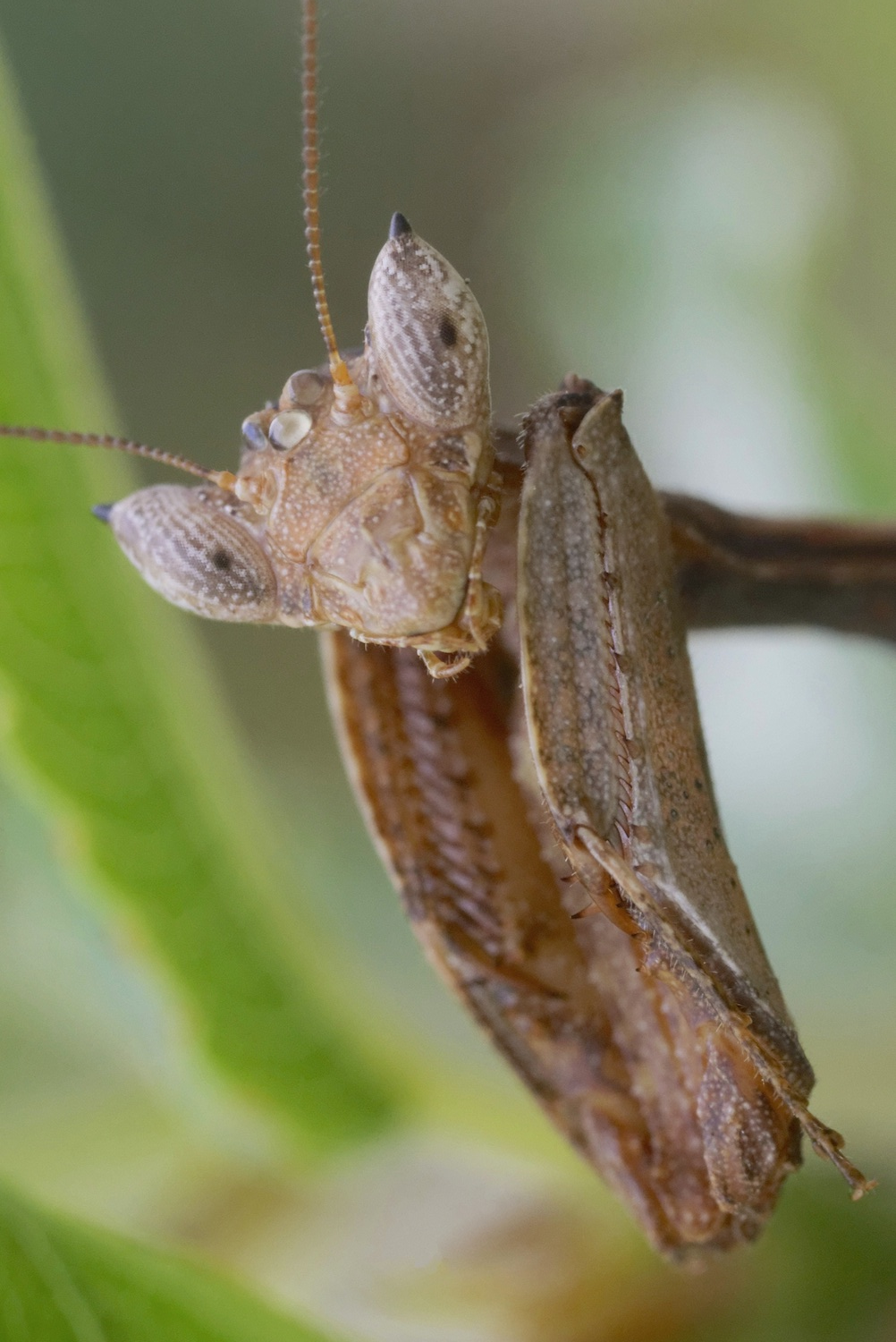
closeup of male Acanthops, possibly A. fuscifolia, showing the thornlike tubercle on each eye

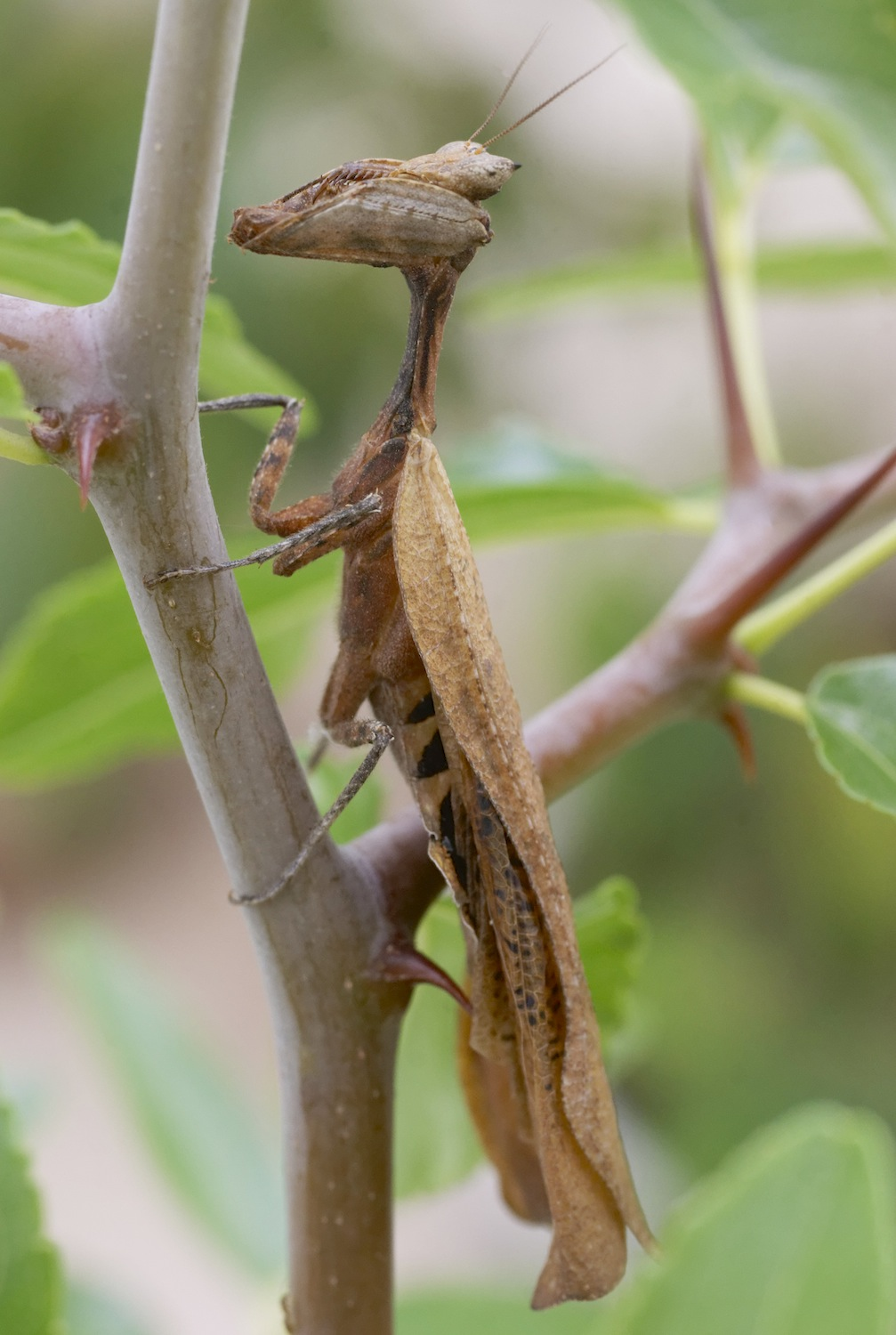
Male Acanthops, possibly A. fuscifolia, with grasping arms cupped in a more stipule-like camouflage posture

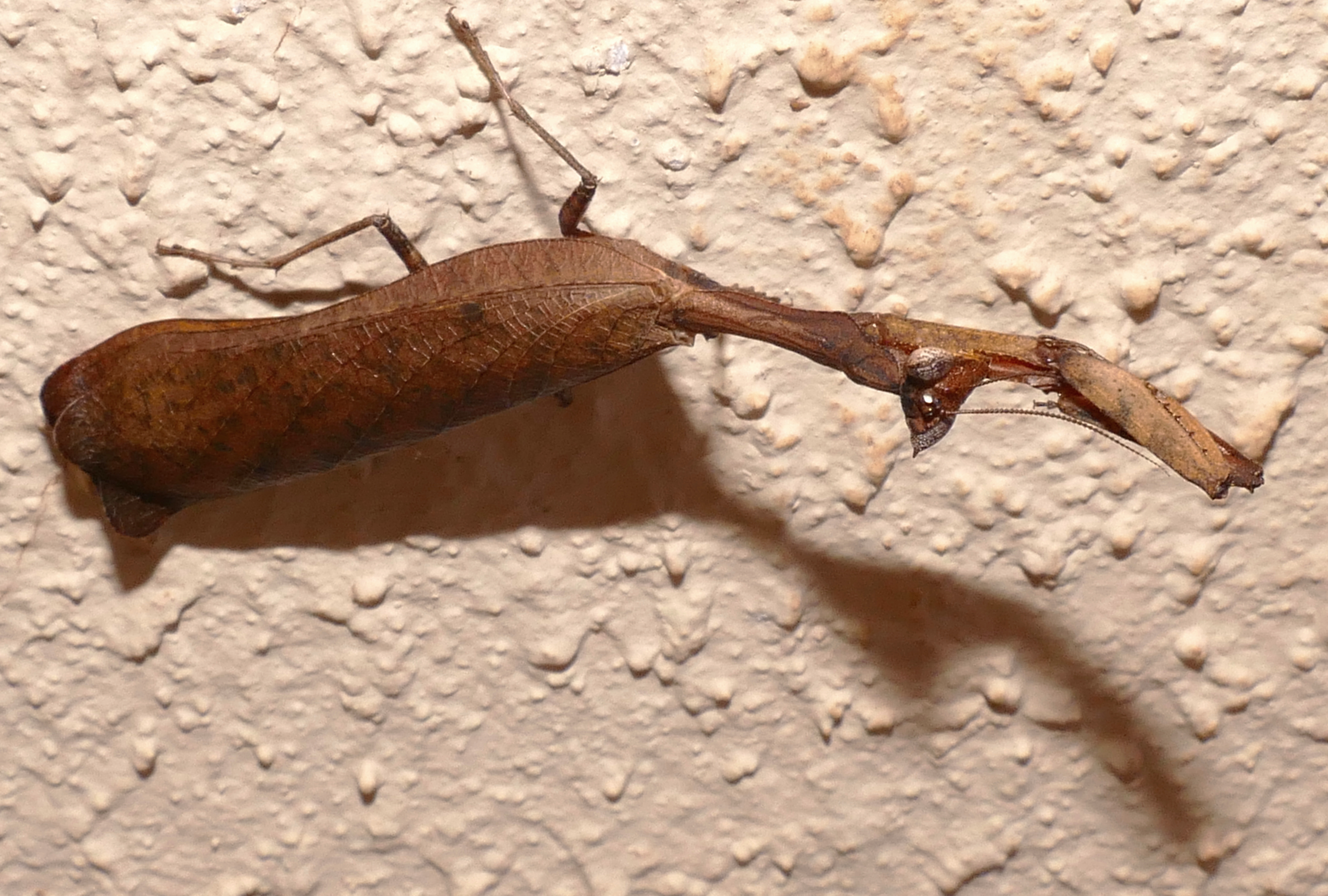
Male Acanthops sp. with grasping arms partly extended in a more petiole-like camouflage posture

- Acanthops bidens Hebard, 1922
- Acanthops boliviana Chopard, 1916
- Acanthops brunneri Saussure, 1871
- Acanthops centralis Lombardo & Ippolito, 2004
- Acanthops coloradensis González, Miller & J Salazar, 2011
- Acanthops contorta Gerstaecker, 1889
- Acanthops elegans Lombardo & Ippolito, 2004
- Acanthops erosa Serville, 1839
- Acanthops erosula Stal, 1877
- Acanthops falcata Stal, 1877
- Acanthops falcataria (Goeze, 1778)
- Acanthops fuscifolia (Olivier, 1792)
- Acanthops godmani Saussure & Zehntner, 1894
- Acanthops occidentalis Lombardo & Ippolito, 2004
- Acanthops onorei Lombardo & Ippolito, 2004
- Acanthops parafalcata Lombardo & Ippolito, 2004
- Acanthops parva Beier, 1941
- Acanthops royi Lombardo & Ippolito, 2004
- Acanthops soukana Roy, 2002

== See also ==
- List of mantis genera and species
