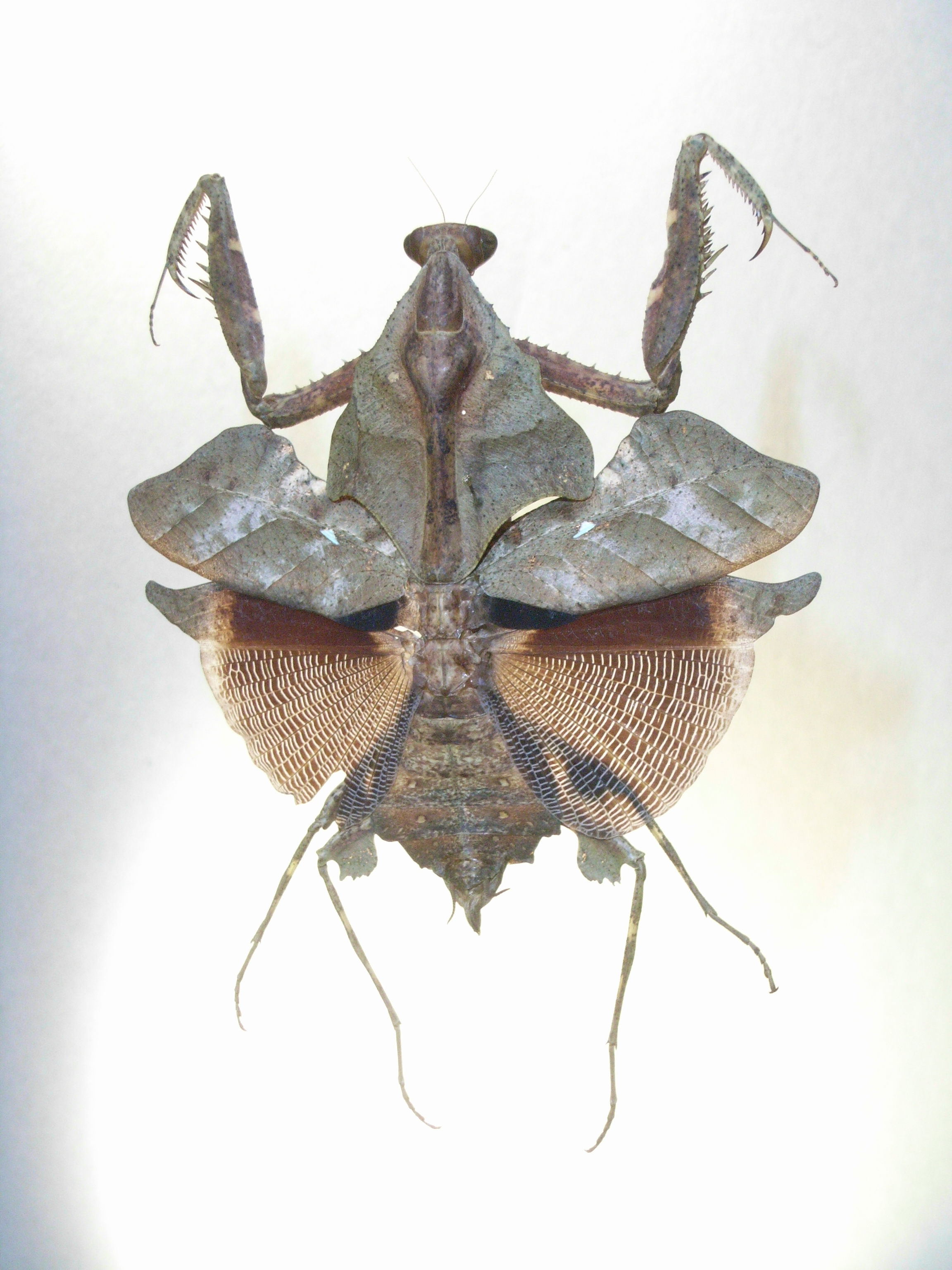
- Deroplatys lobata specimen Ex coll.Felix Stumpe, adult female

Scientific classification
- Kingdom: Animalia
- Phylum: Arthropoda
- Clade: Pancrustacea
- Class: Insecta
- Order: Mantodea
- Family: Deroplatyidae
- Genus: Deroplatys
- Species: D. lobata

Binomial name
- Deroplatys lobata Guérin-Méneville 1838

Synonyms
- Deroplatys brunneri Kirby, 1904

= Deroplatys lobata =

Species of praying mantis

Deroplatys lobata, common name Southeast Asian dead leaf mantis or dead leaf mantis, is a species of praying mantis that inhabits Thailand, Java, Borneo, Indonesia, Sumatra and the Malay Peninsula.

== Habitat ==
Deroplatys lobata live on the ground around dead leaves and bushes in damp areas, tropical forests.

== Description ==
This mantis mimics dead leaves. Females are about 65 to 70mm in length and males are about 45mm in length. 1st instar nymphs are up to 15mm in length and 2nd instar nymphs are about 21mm in length when their abdomens are expanded. Their coloring ranges from dark gray to light mottled gray, with many specimens exhibiting a slight pinkish 'flush' on the head and thorax. They also possess a broad prothorax that looks ripped and crumpled like a leaf. Females have a wider shield than males as early as the 4th instar stage. Males have a slender body and a diamond shape shield.

=== Sexual Dimorphism ===
Due to sexual dimorphism typical of mantises, the male is much smaller. Adult females are about 65mm to 70mm in length while adult males are about 45mm in length. 3rd instar nymphs cannot be sexed by counting the segments on the bottom of the abdomen because unlike most praying mantises 8 segments are visible in all of the 3rd instar nymphs and this is also true when they are in the 1st, 2nd instar stage and their leaf shapes look just about the same at those stages. 4th instar nymph and up their leaf shapes look different from each other and get more different from each other with each molt. 6 segments are seen on females while 8 segments are seen on males at the 4th instar and up.

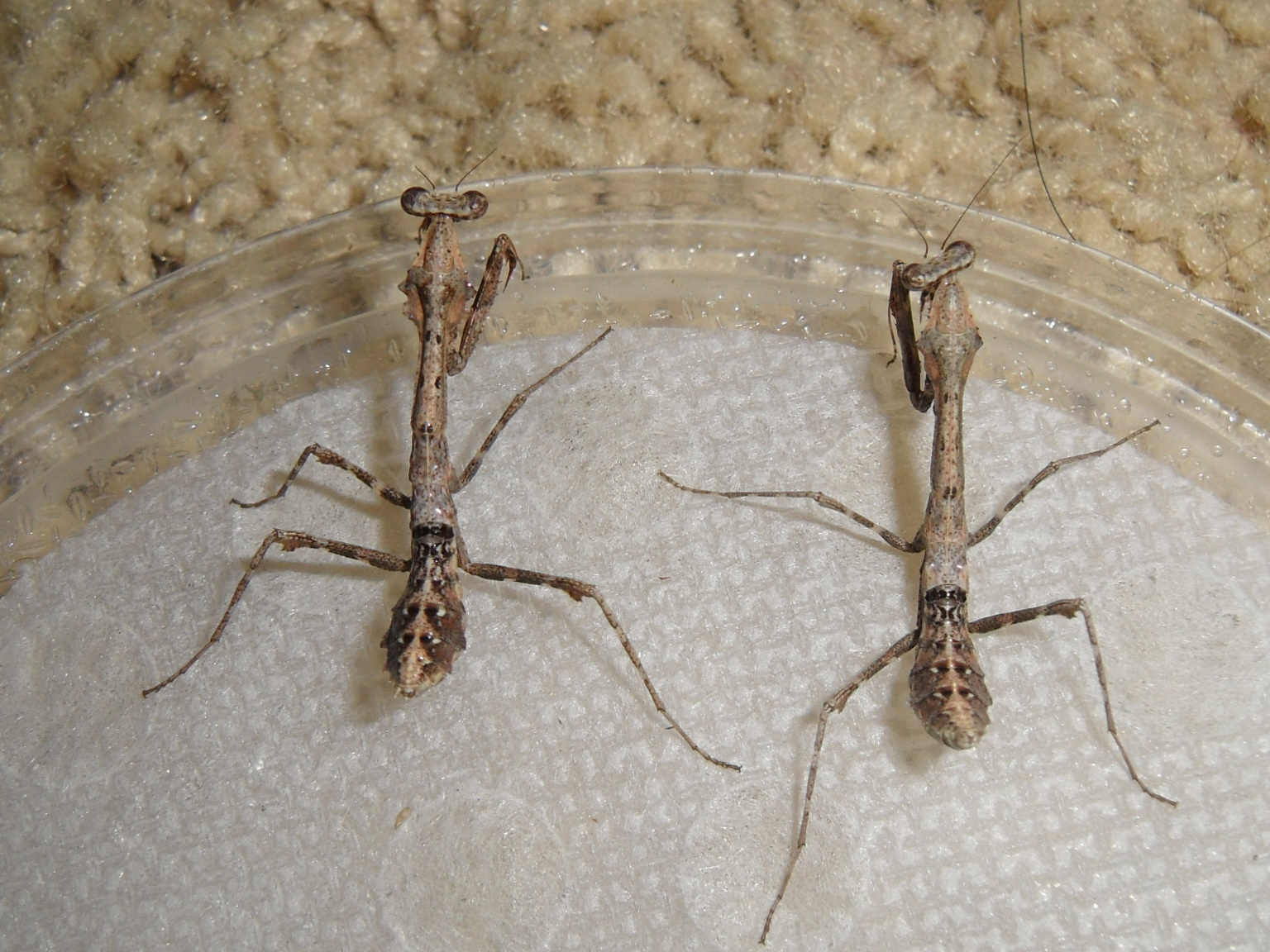
Deroplatys lobata 4th instar nymphs, female on the left, male on the right. At this stage females are usually slightly larger than males.

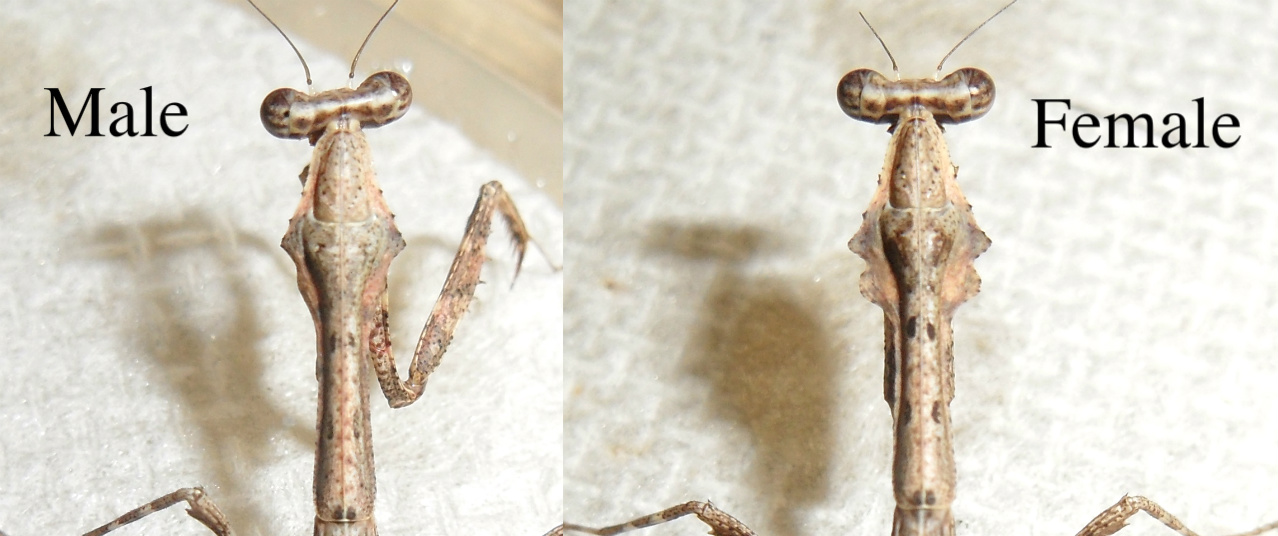
Difference in the thorax at the 4th instar. Deroplatys lobata 4th instar nymphs, female on the right, male on the left.

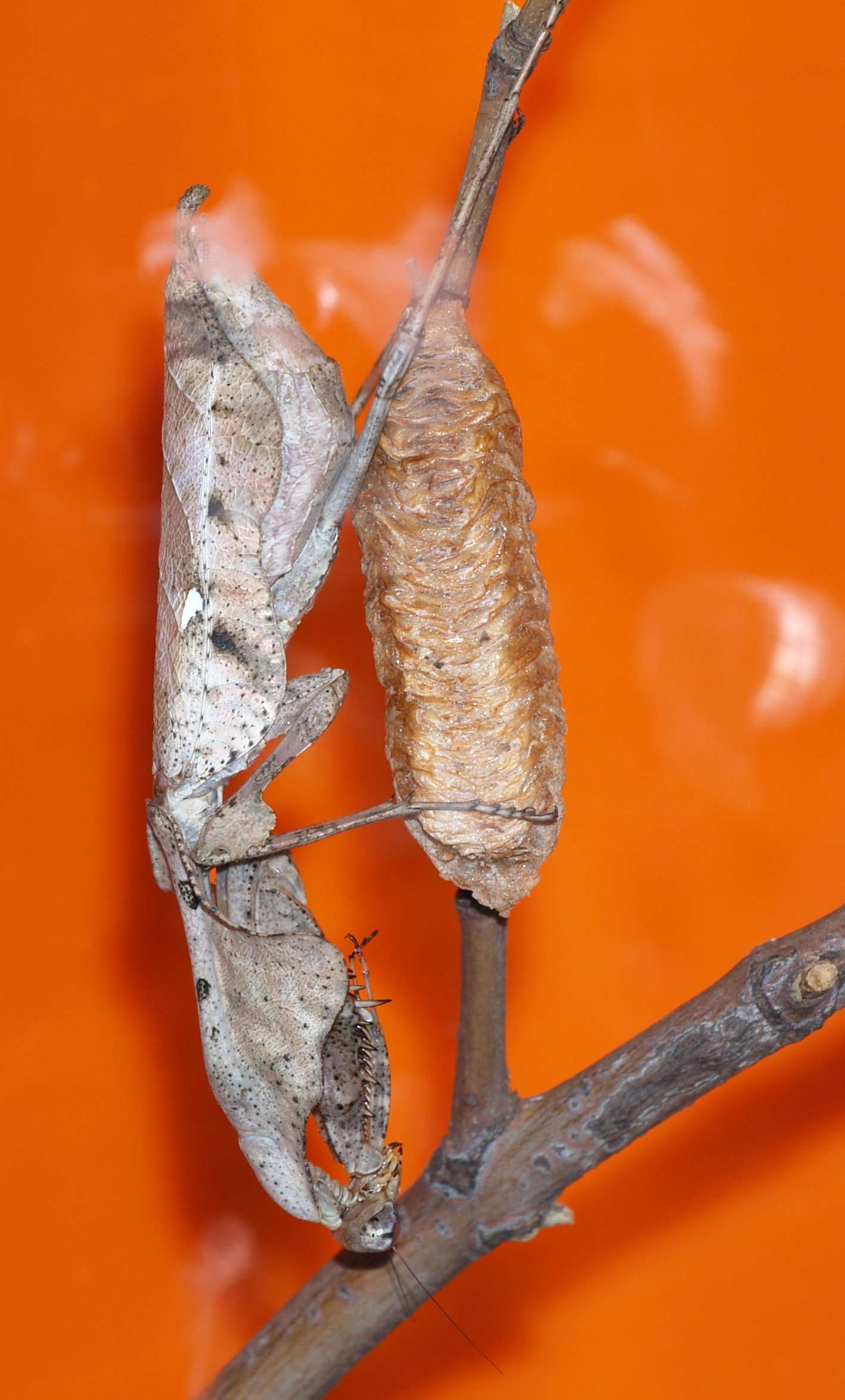
Adult female Deroplatys lobata defending her ootheca

== Additional images ==
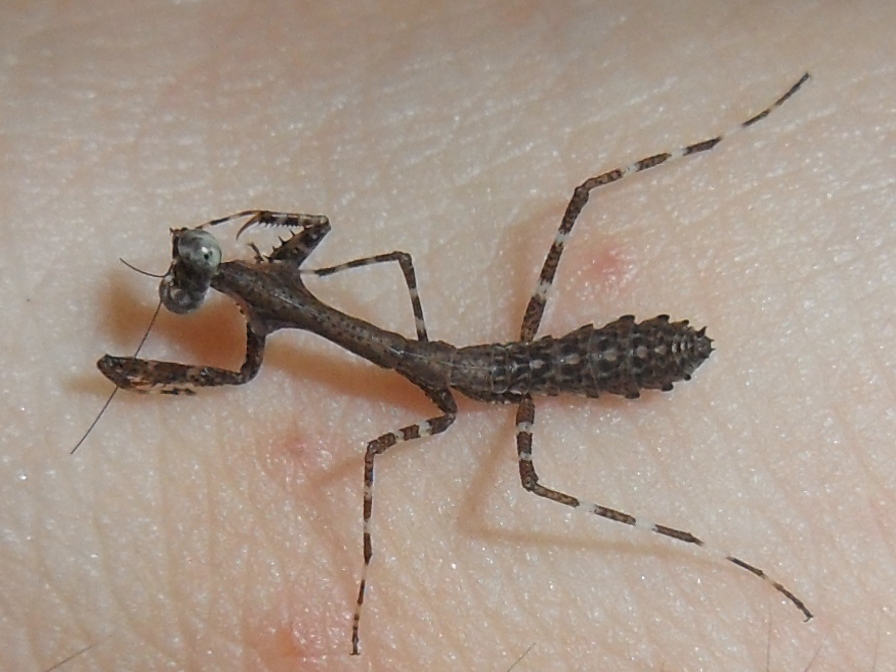
Deroplatys lobata, 1st instar nymph on a hand

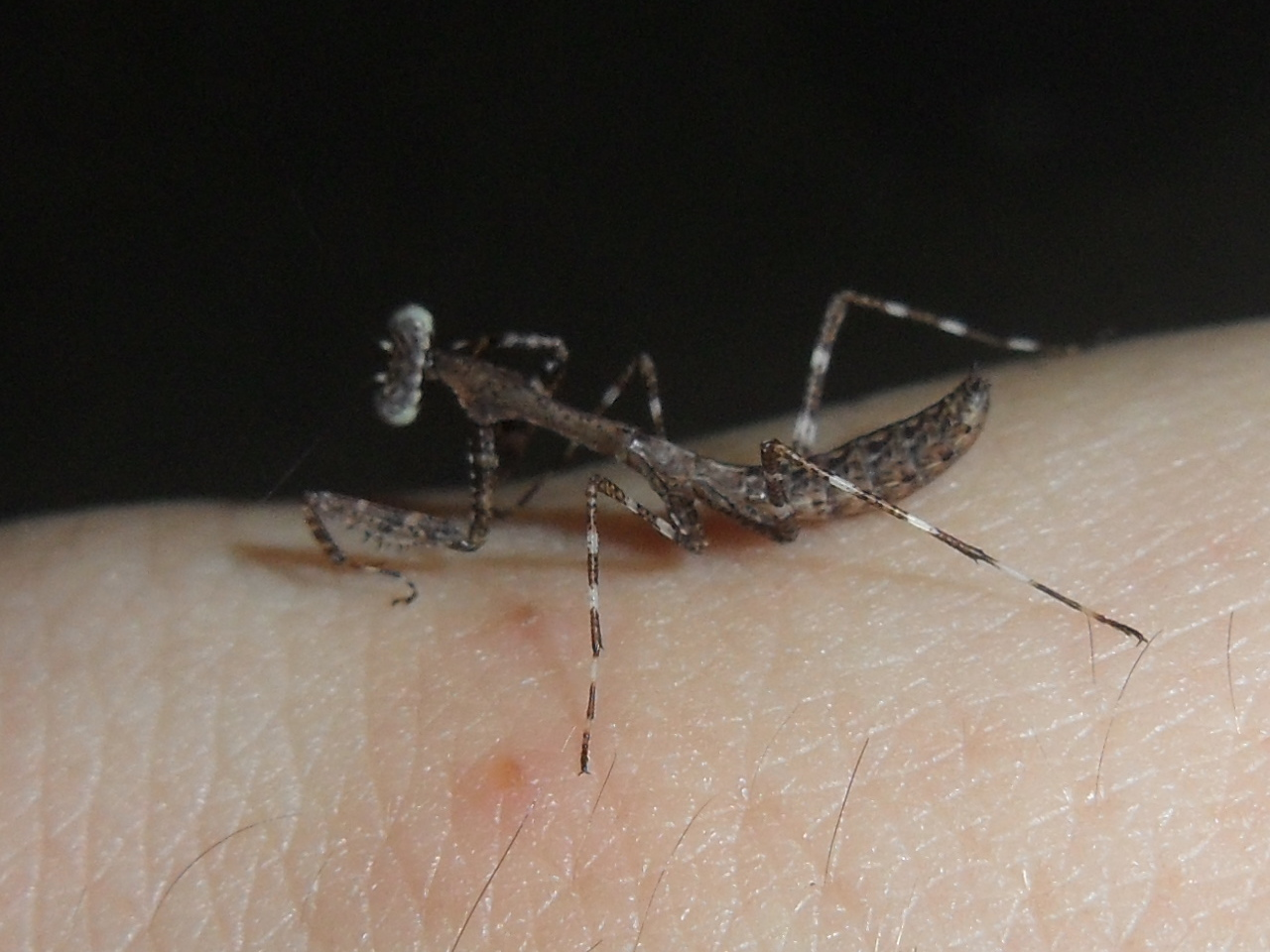
Deroplatys lobata 1st instar nymph on a hand

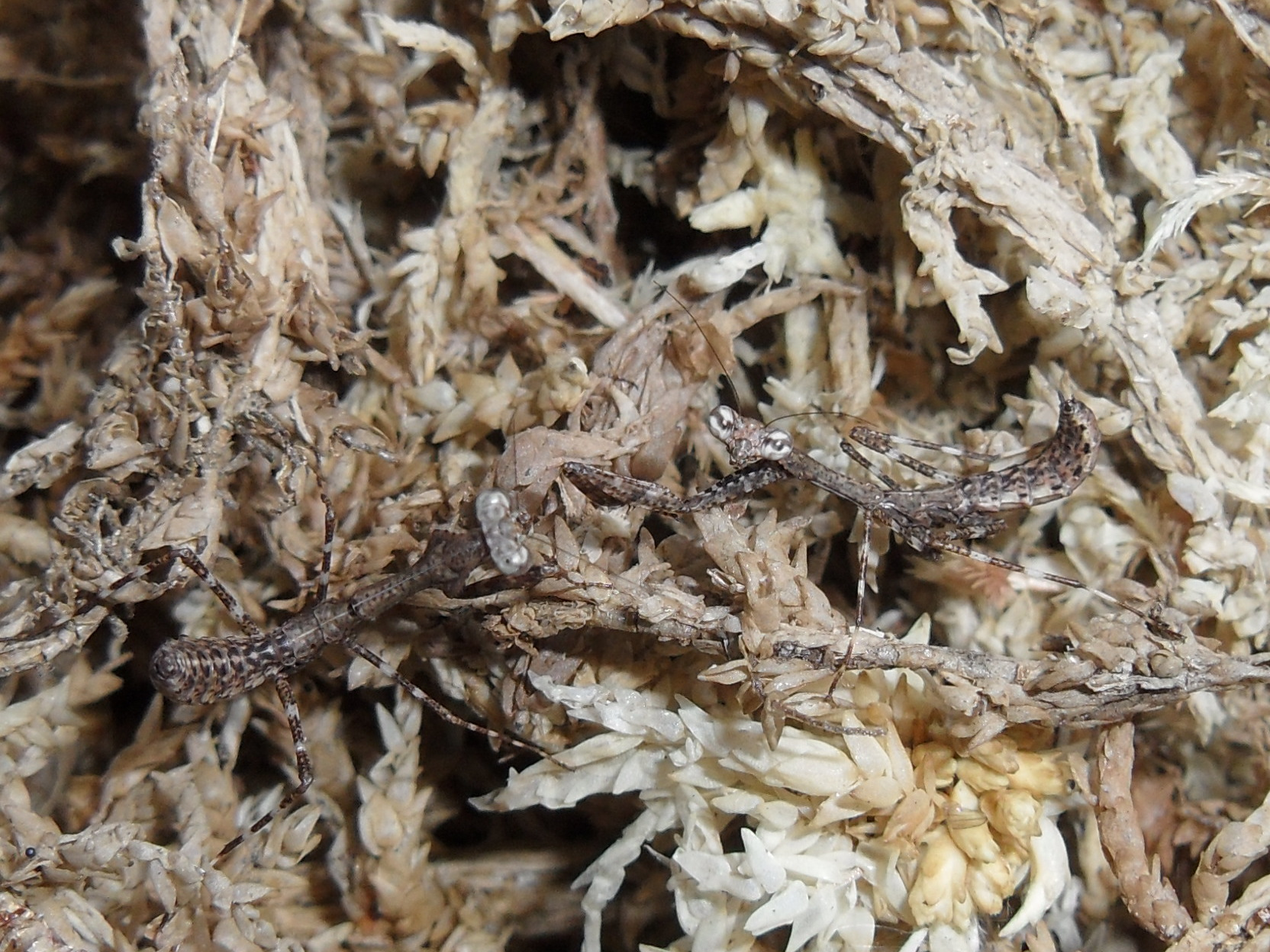
Two 1st instar Deroplatys lobata nymphs (The one on the right is scared and is trying to look something like leaf.)

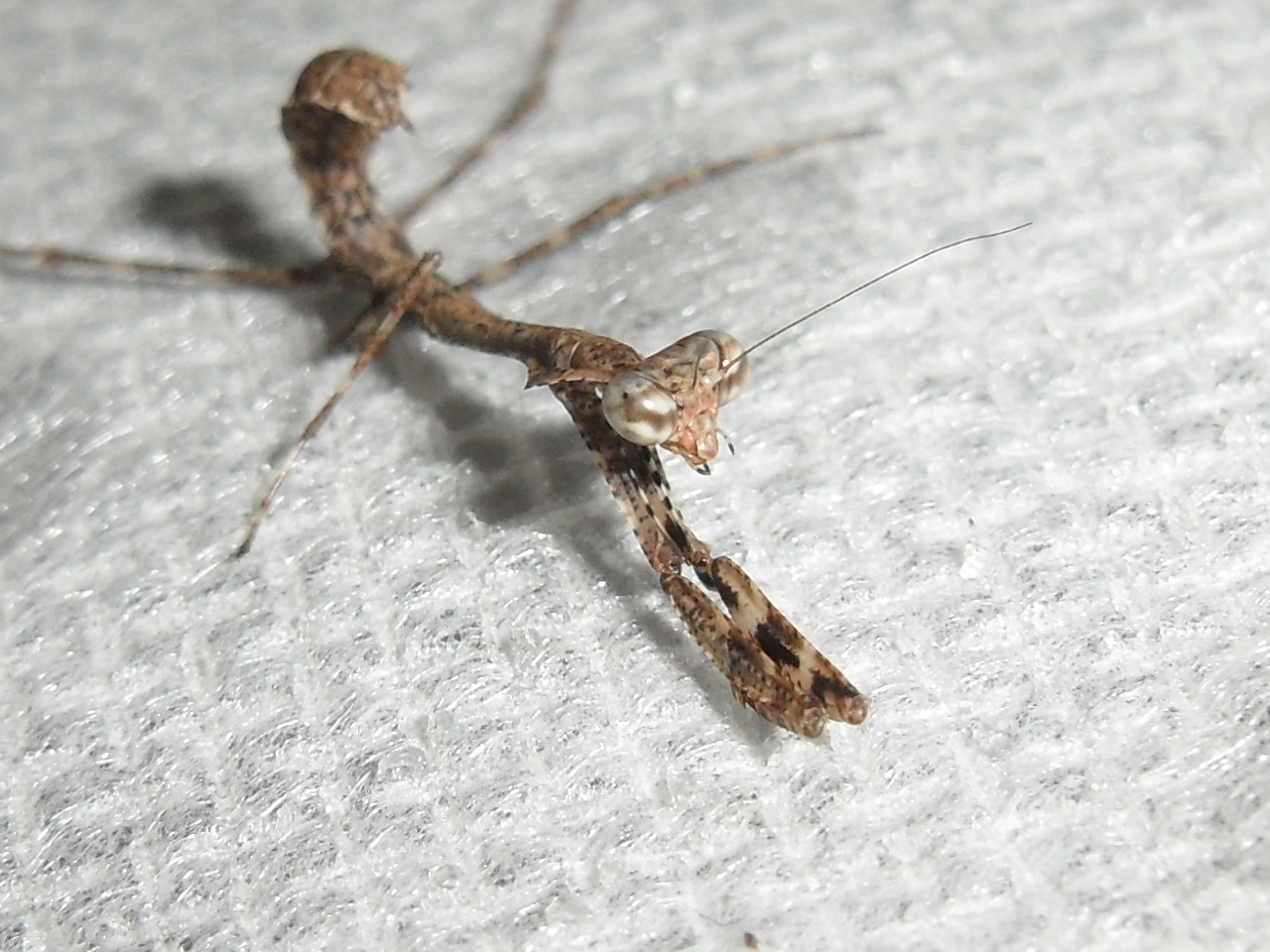
Deroplatys lobata 2nd instar nymph (A little scared so he is flattened out with his front legs stretched out forward.)

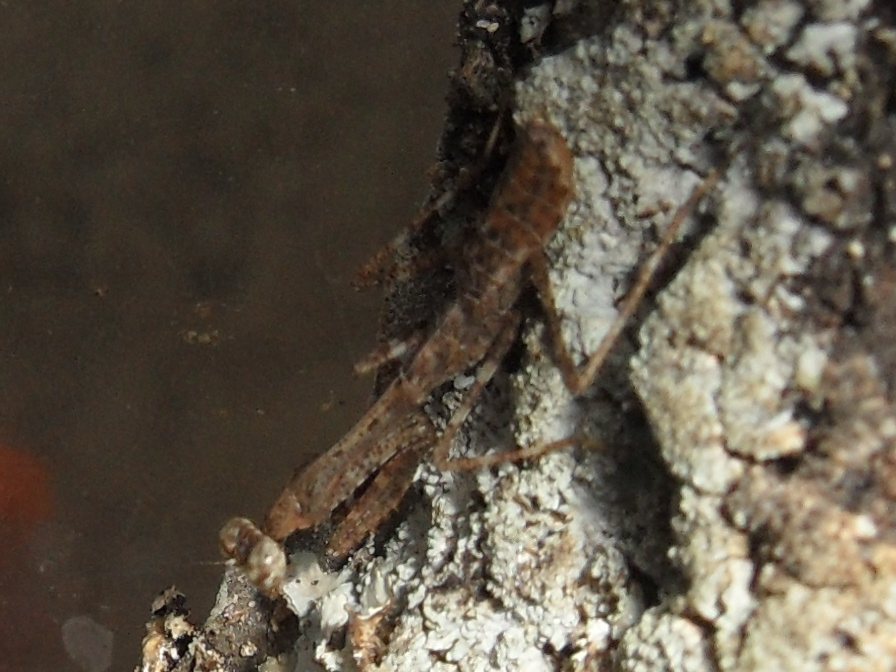
Deroplatys lobata 2nd instar nymph (He is scared so he is flattened out quite a bit but strangely his front legs are in their normal position.)

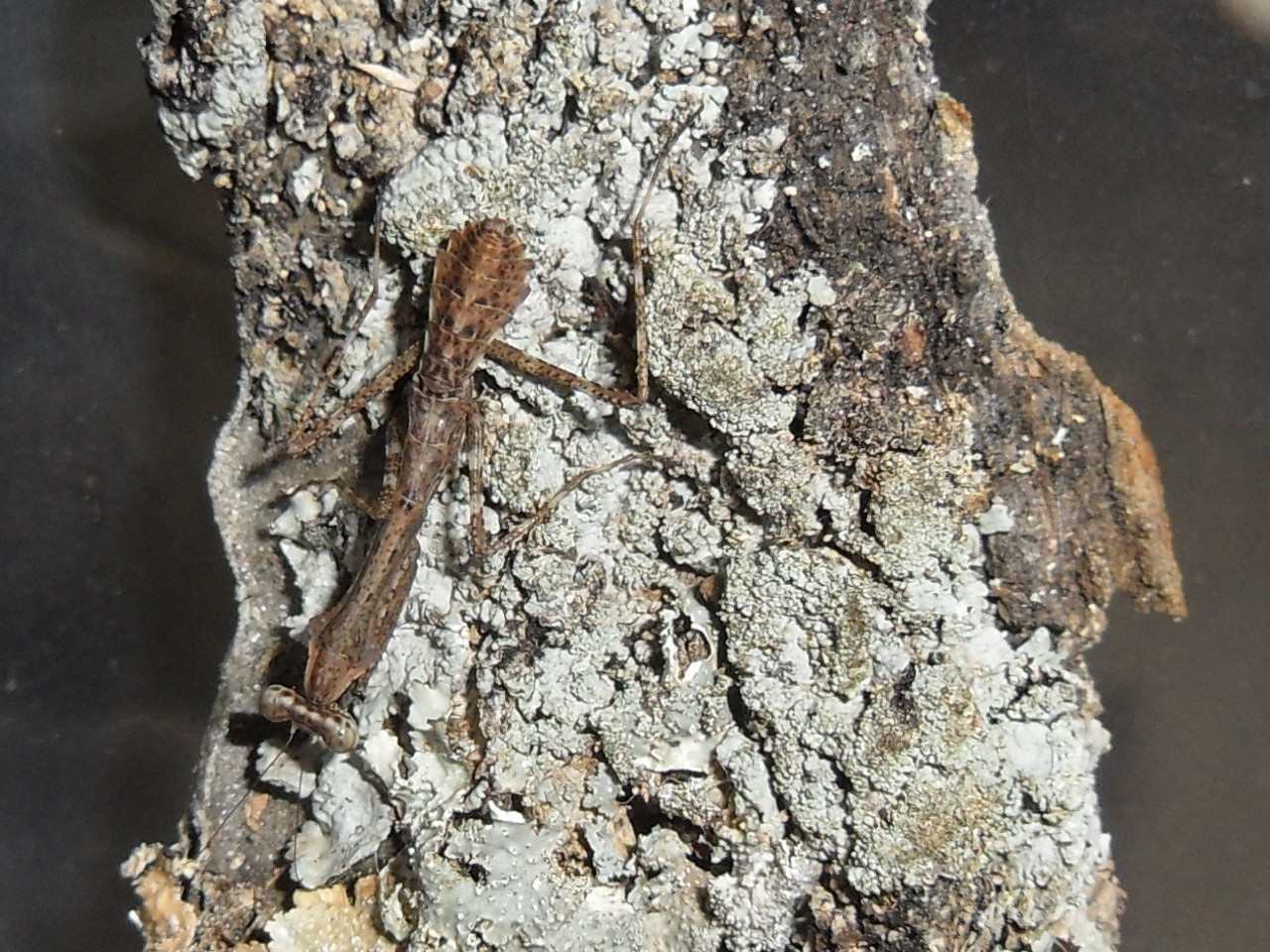
Deroplatys lobata 2nd instar nymph (He is scared so he is flattened out quite a bit but strangely his front legs are in their normal position.)

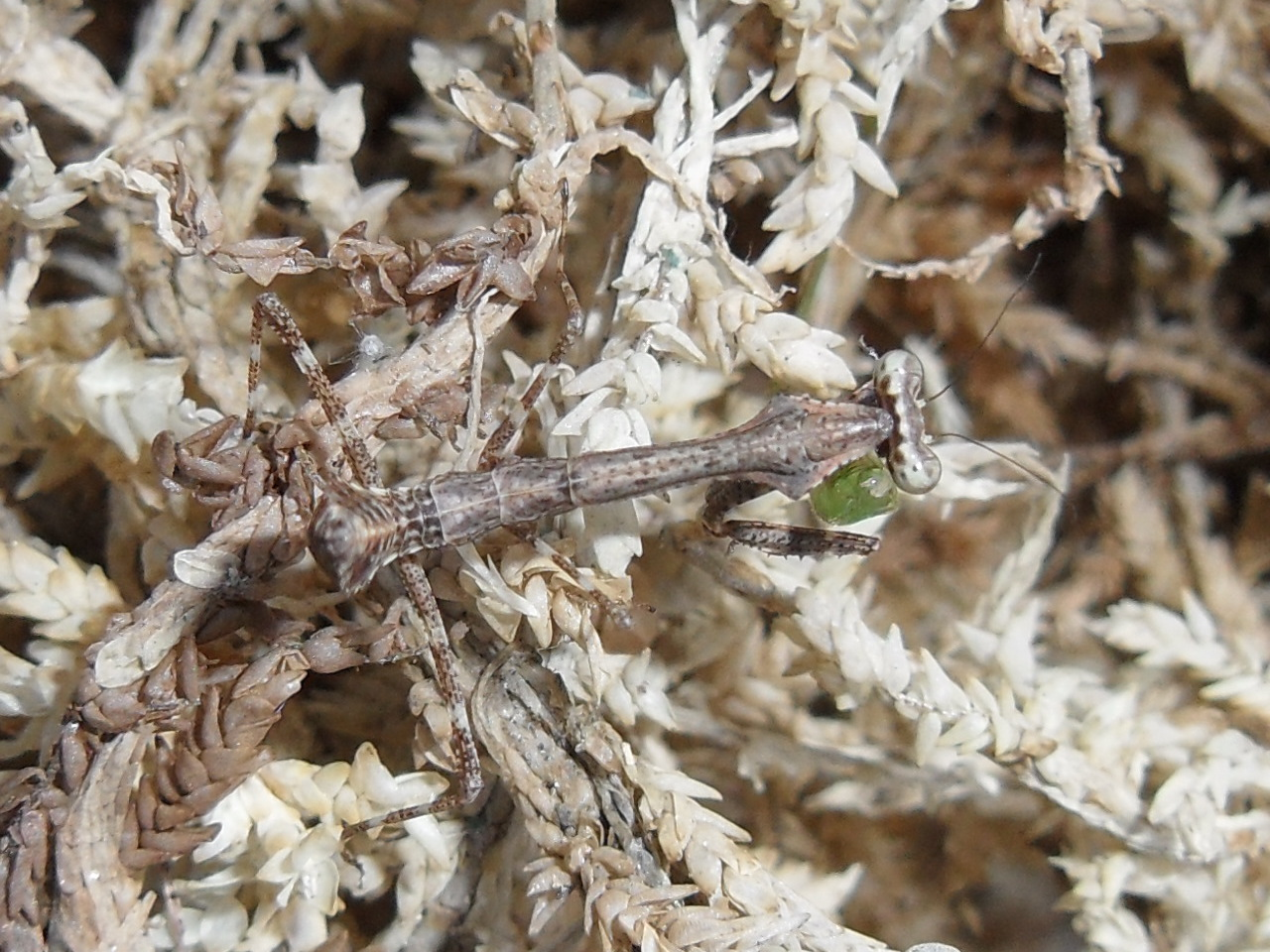
Deroplatys lobata 2nd instar nymph

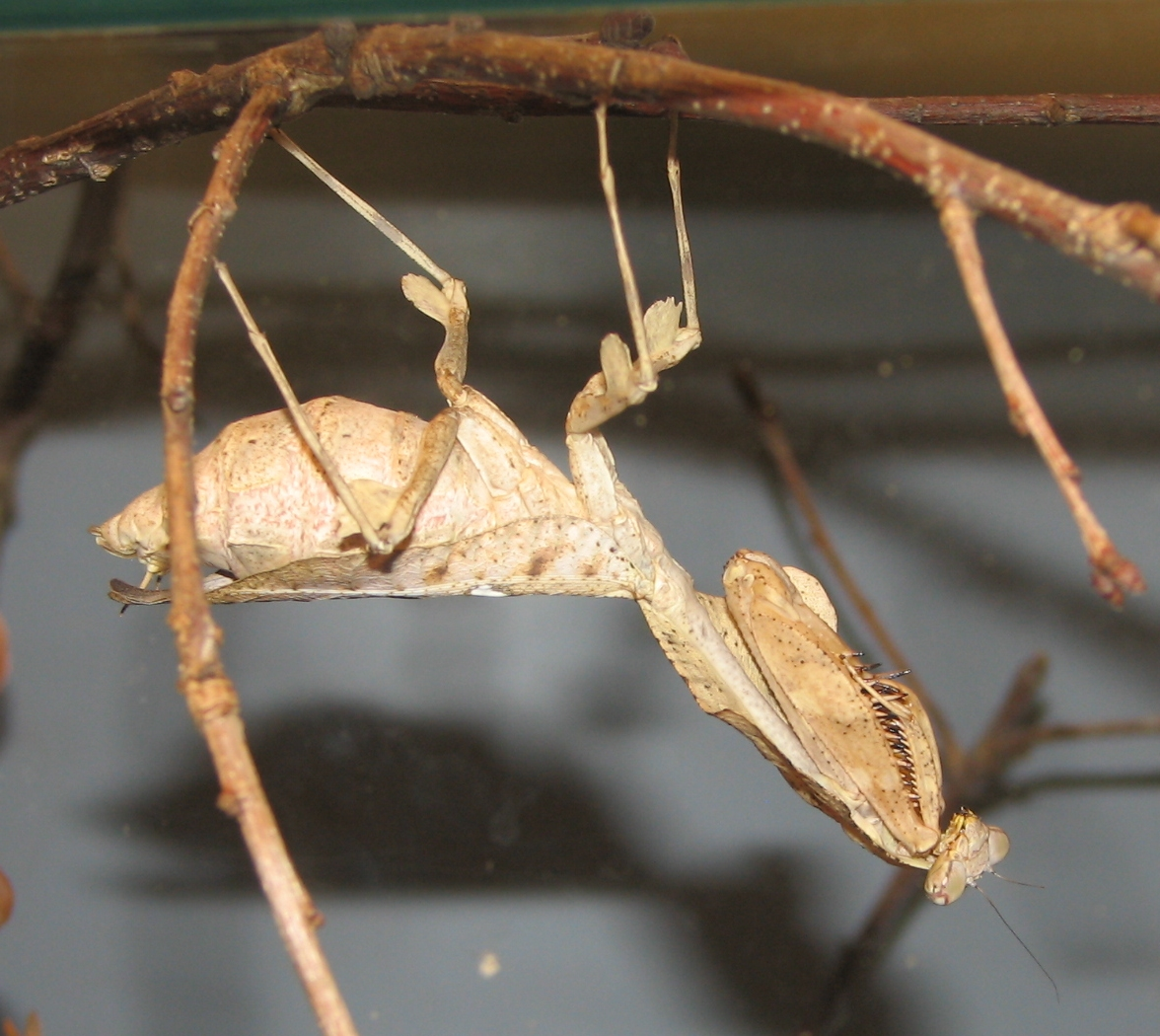
Adult female Deroplatys lobata

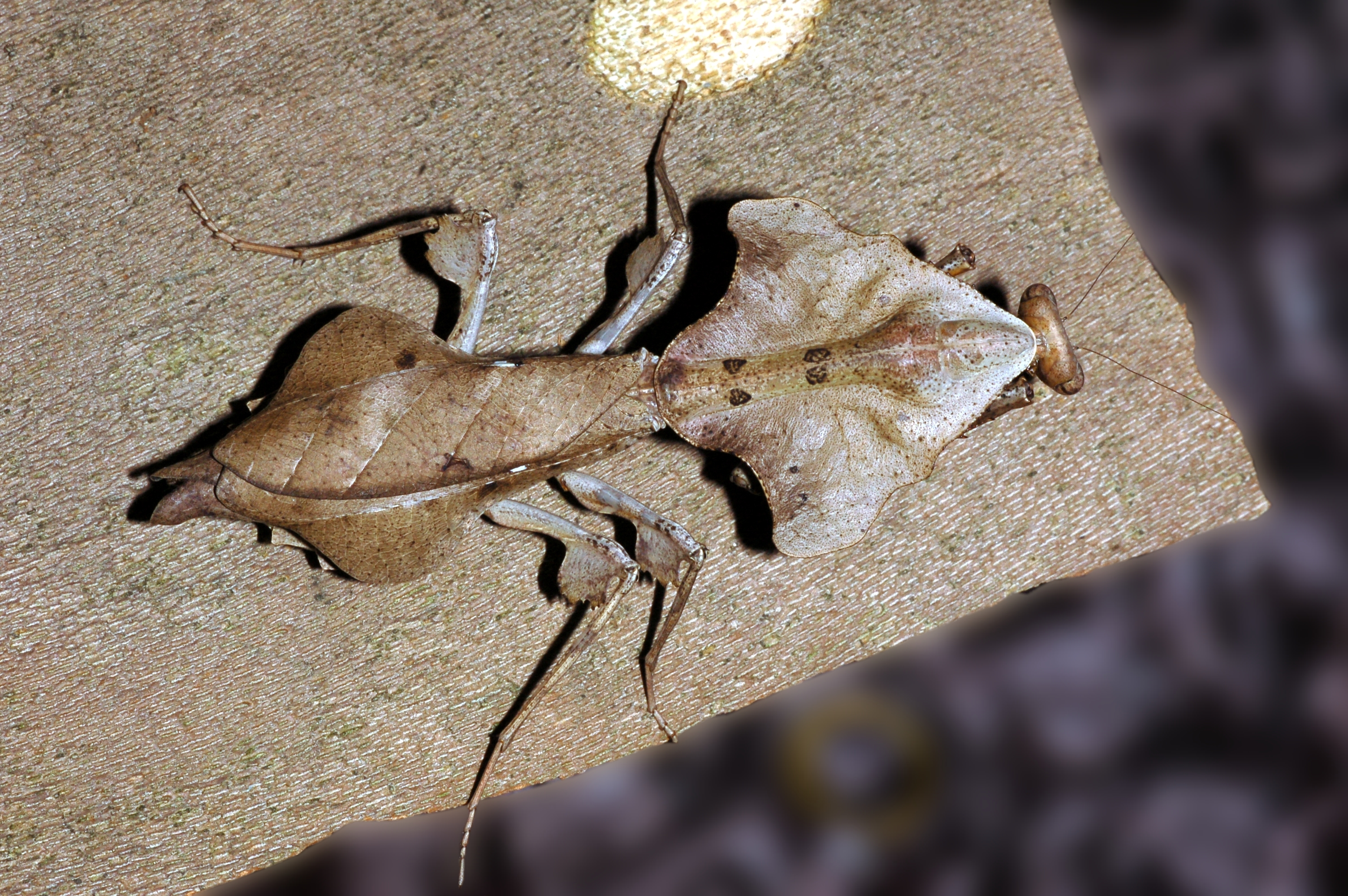
Adult female Deroplatys lobata

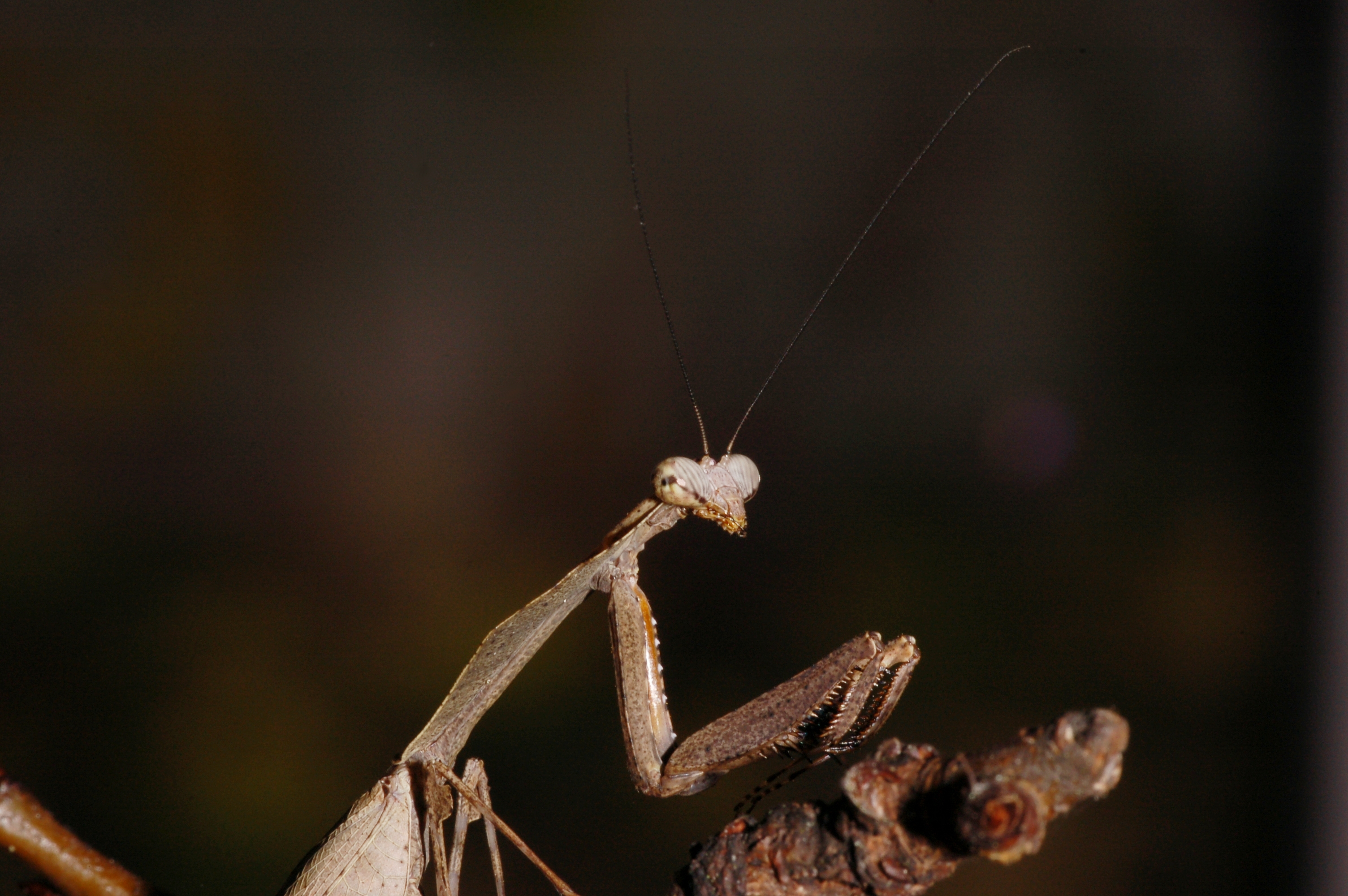
Adult male Deroplatys lobata

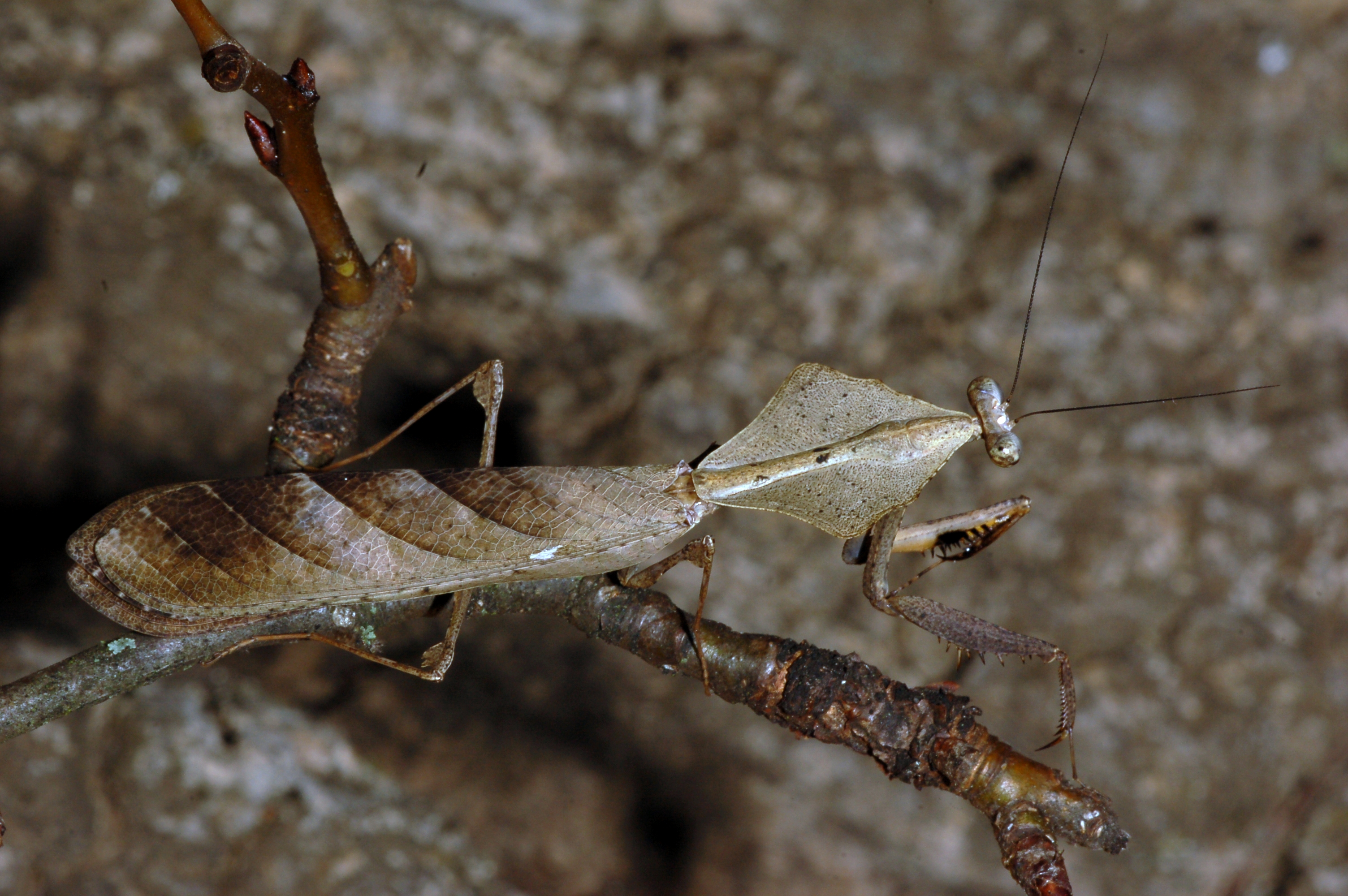
Adult male Deroplatys lobata

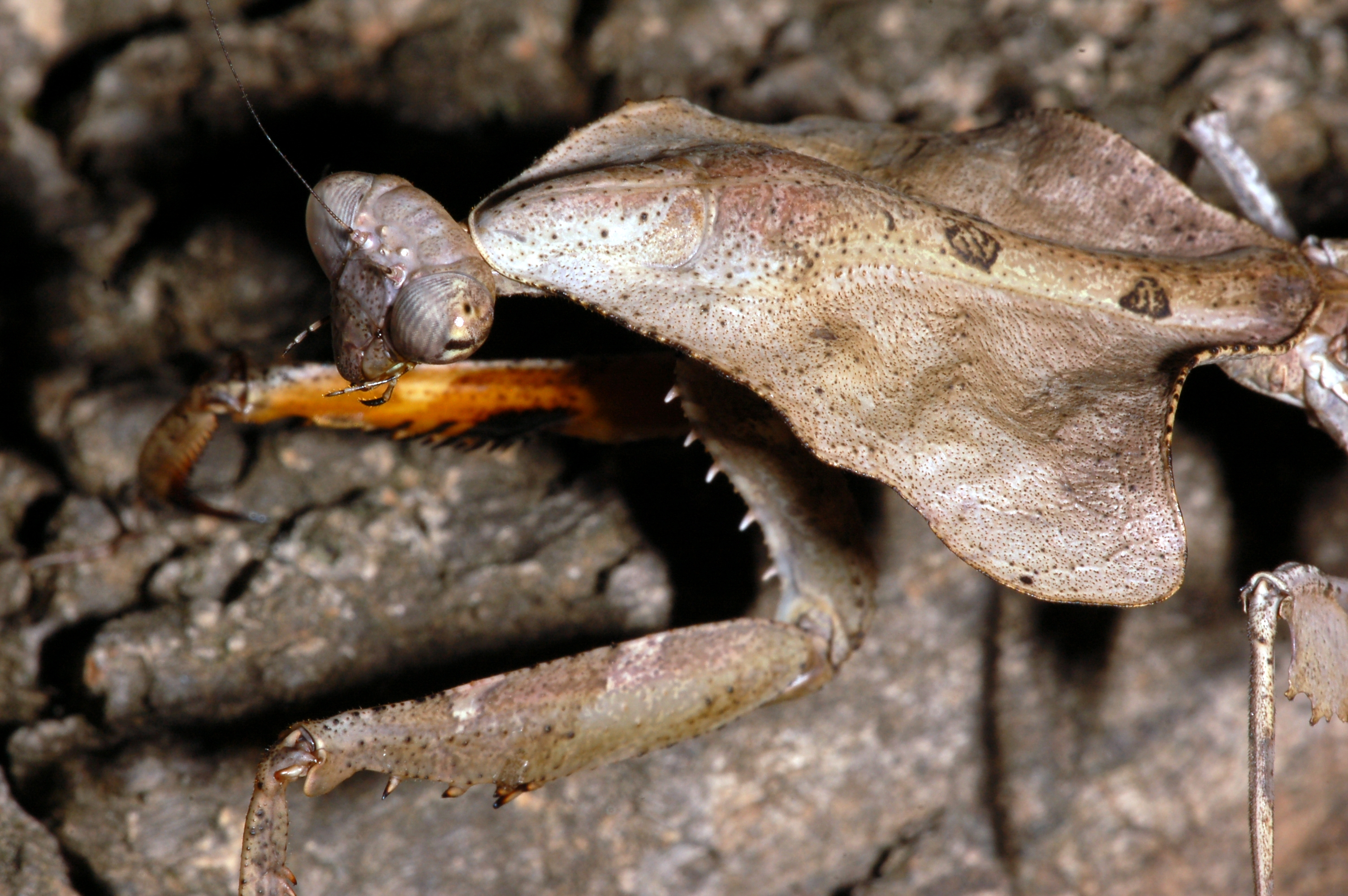
Adult female Deroplatys lobata

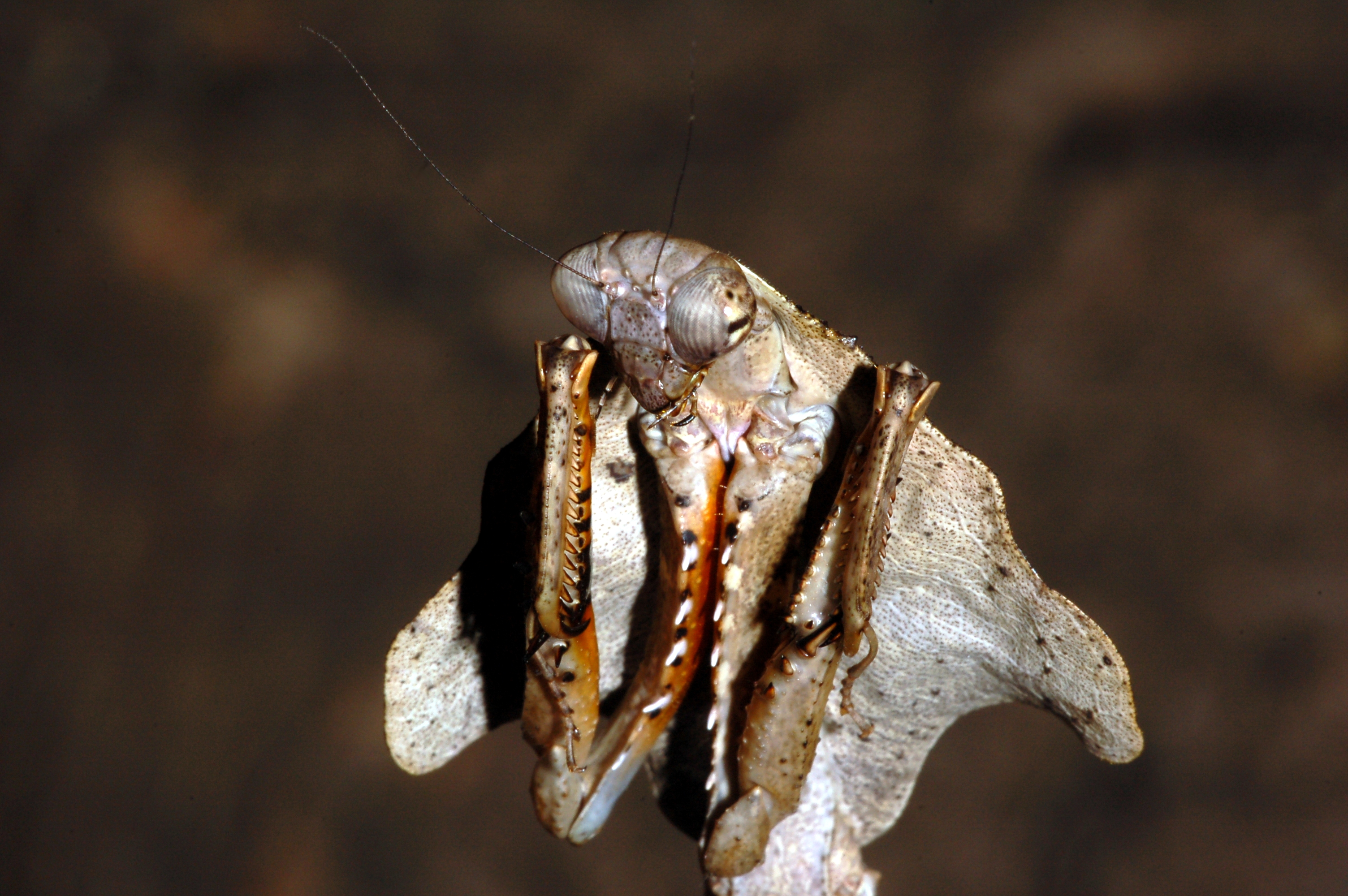
Adult female Deroplatys lobata

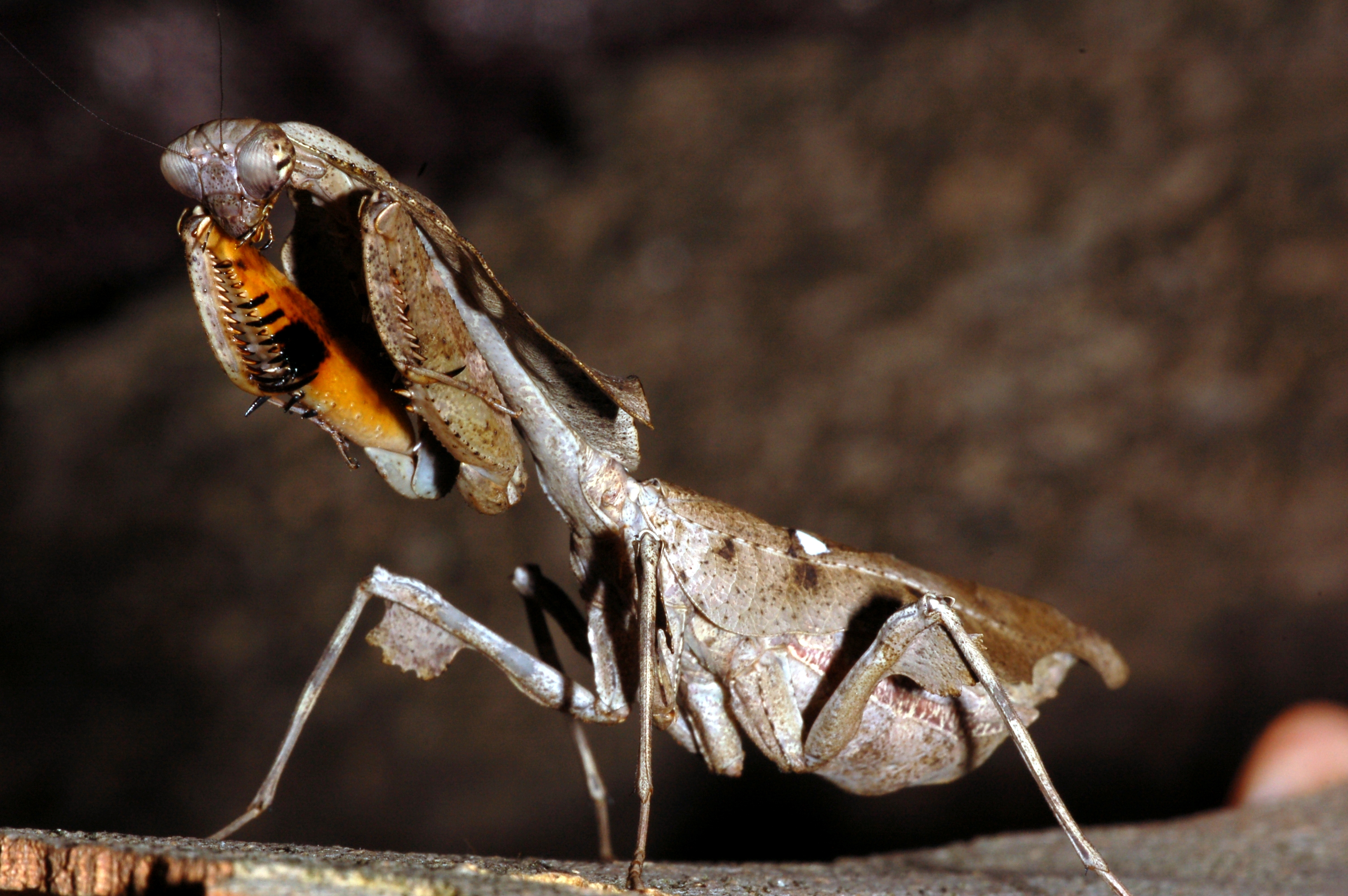
Adult female Deroplatys lobata

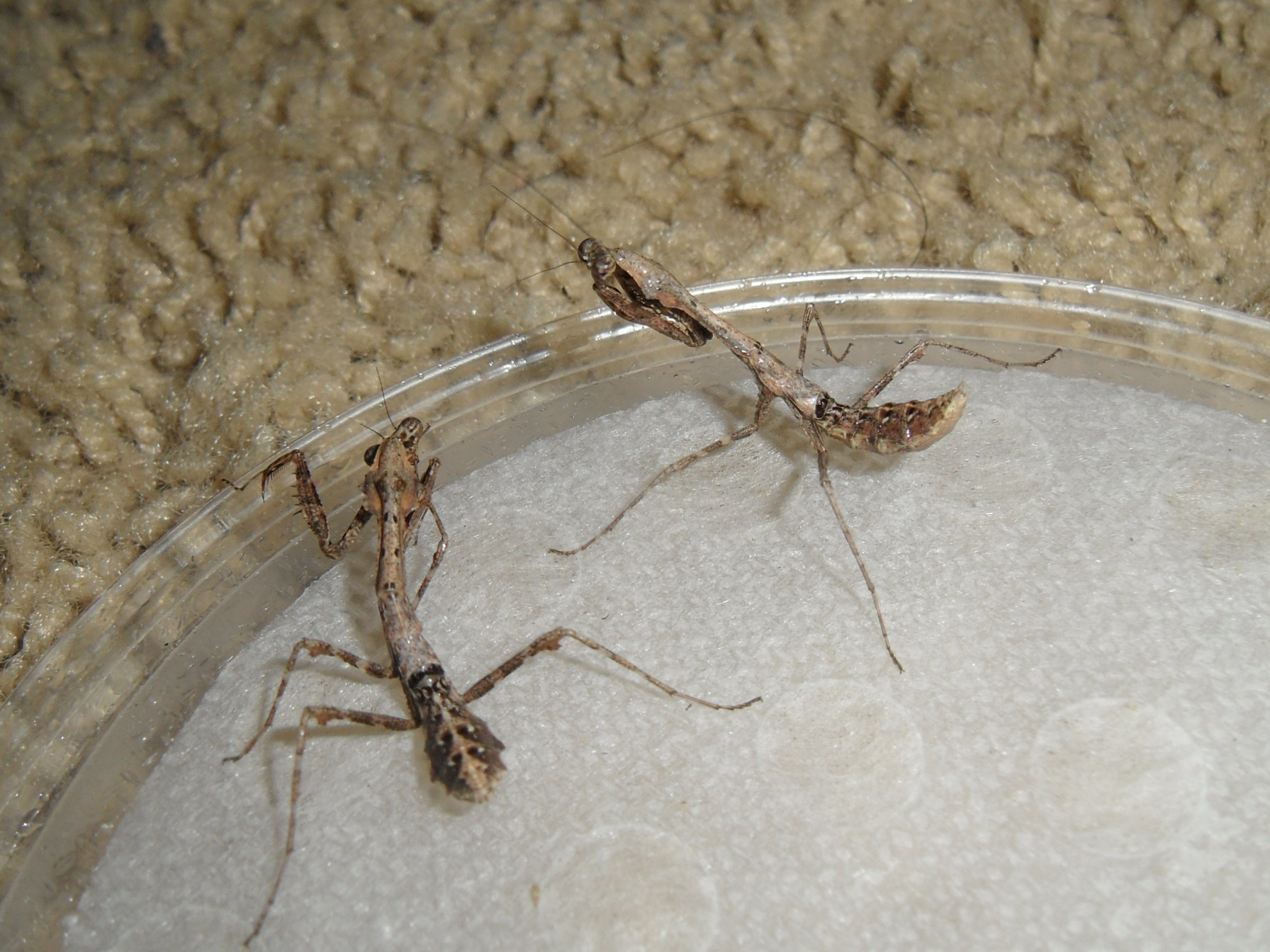
Female and male Deroplatys lobata 4th instar nymphs (female on the left, male on the right)

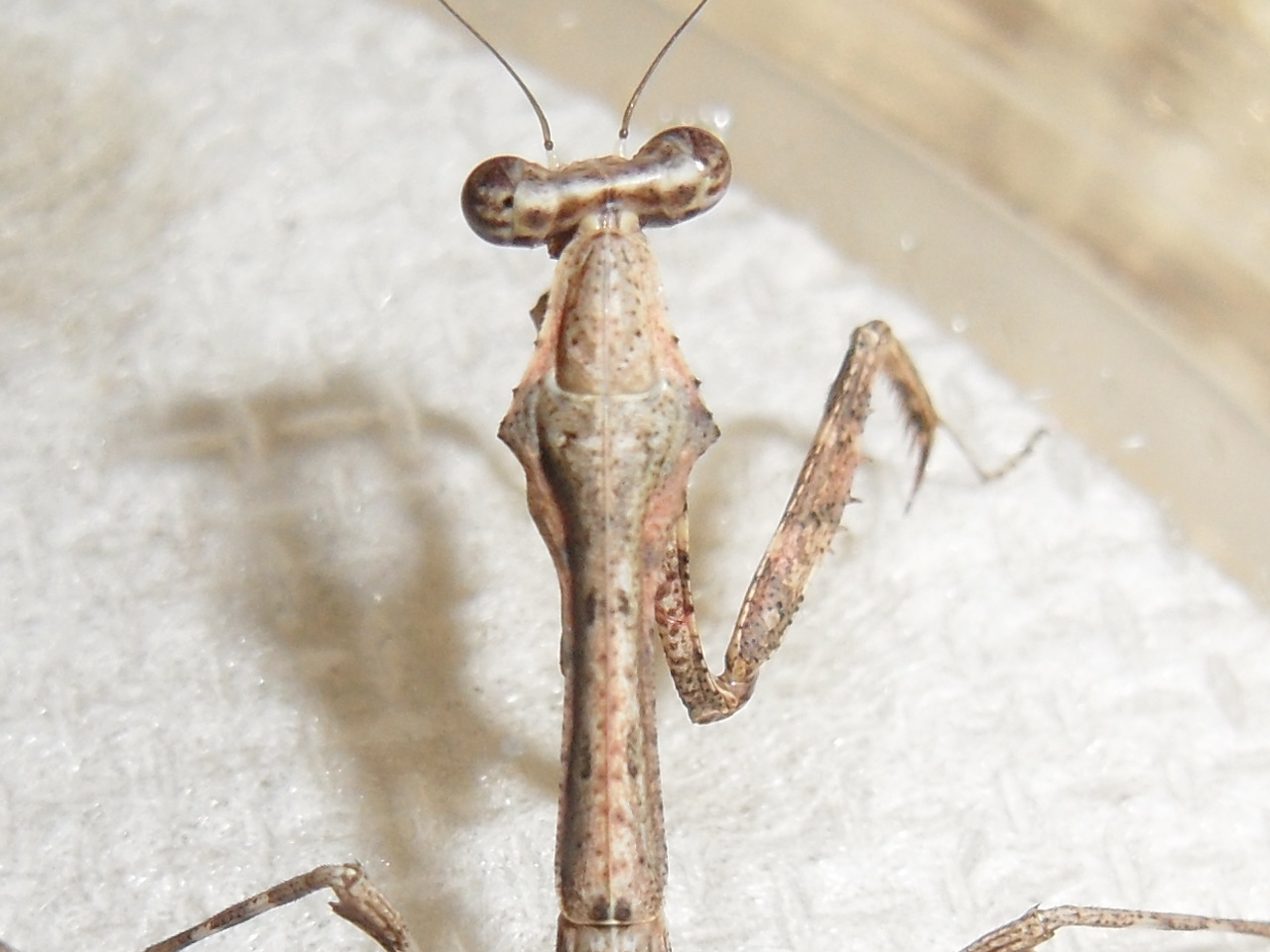
Carapace of a male Deroplatys lobata 4th instar nymph

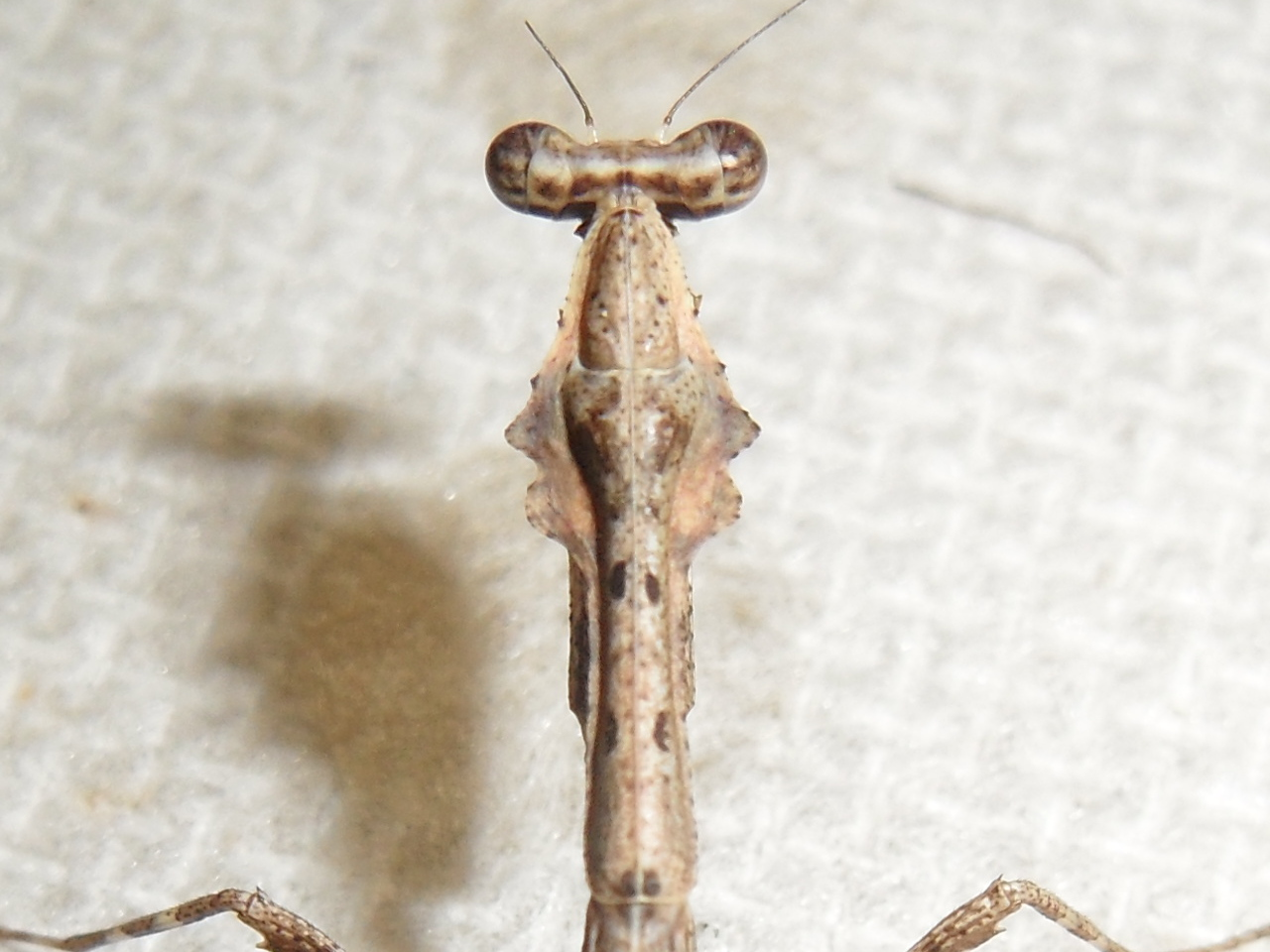
Carapace of a female Deroplatys lobata 4th instar nymph

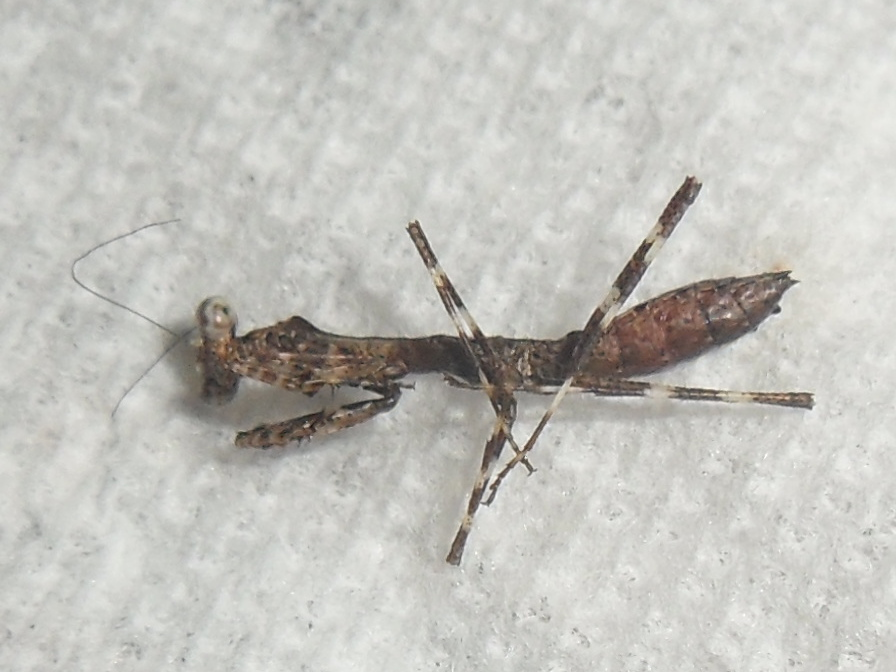
Dead 1st instar nymph

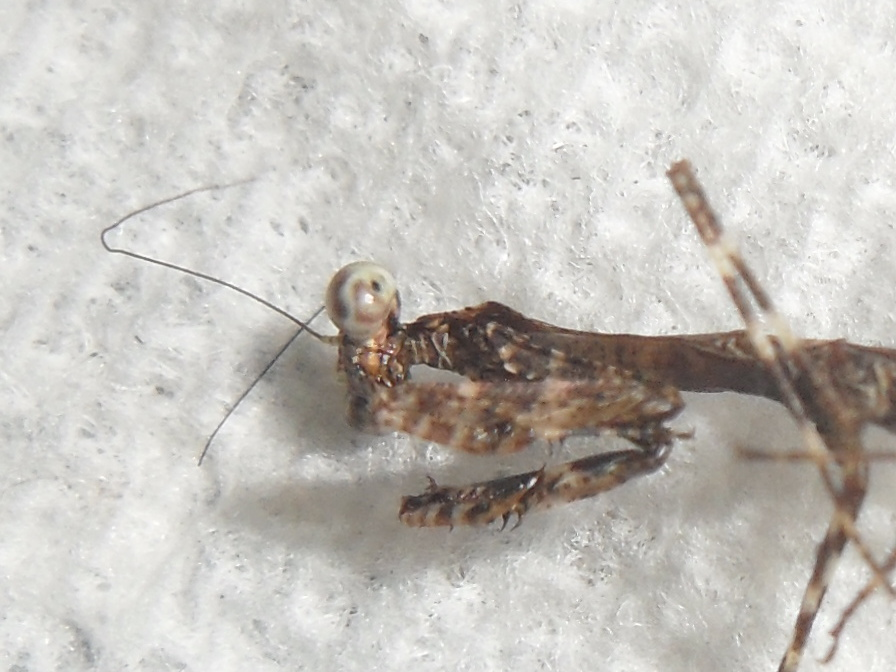
Dead 1st instar nymph

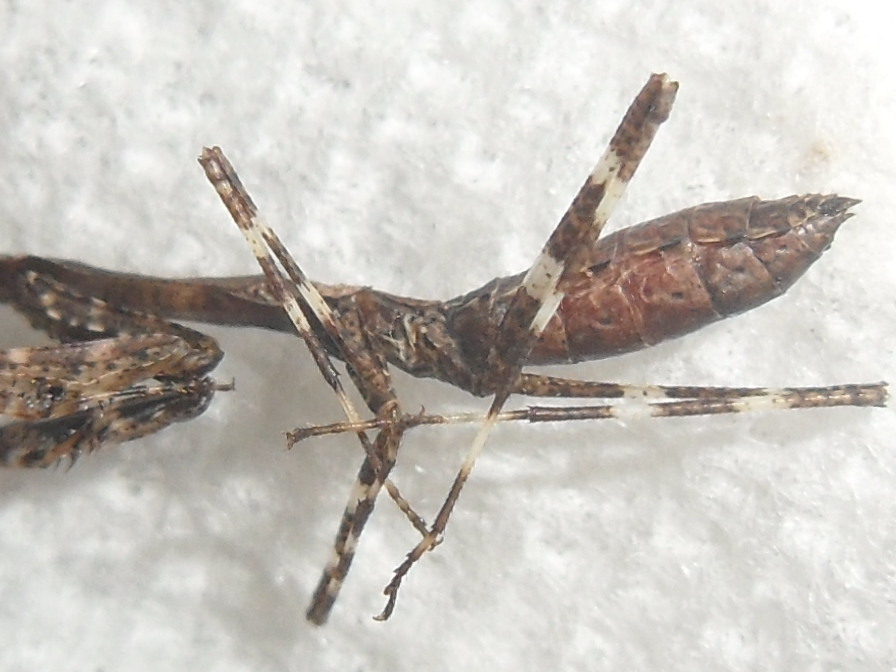
Dead 1st instar nymph

== See also ==
- Dead leaf mantis
- List of mantis genera and species
