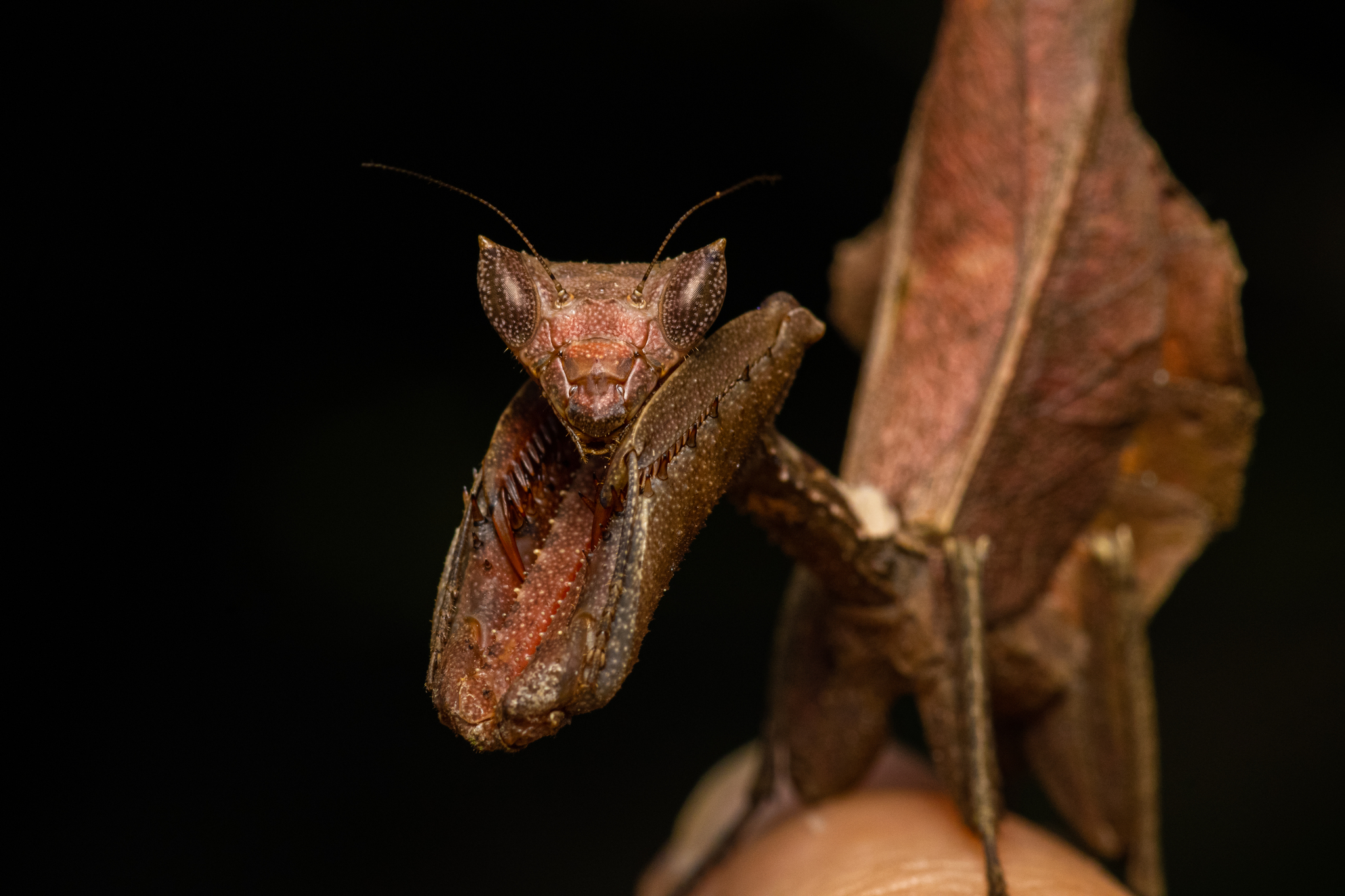
- Acanthops falcataria in São Paulo, Brazil

Scientific classification
- Kingdom: Animalia
- Phylum: Arthropoda
- Clade: Pancrustacea
- Class: Insecta
- Order: Mantodea
- Family: Acanthopidae
- Genus: Acanthops
- Species: A. falcataria

Binomial name
- Acanthops falcataria (Goeze, 1778)

Synonyms
- Acanthops angulata Lichtenstein, 1802; Acanthops mortuifolia Serville, 1839

= Acanthops falcataria =

Species of praying mantis

Acanthops falcataria, common name South American dead leaf mantis, is a species of mantis in the family Acanthopidae. It is not to be confused with Acanthops falcata, a different species in the same genus that is often referred to with the same common name.

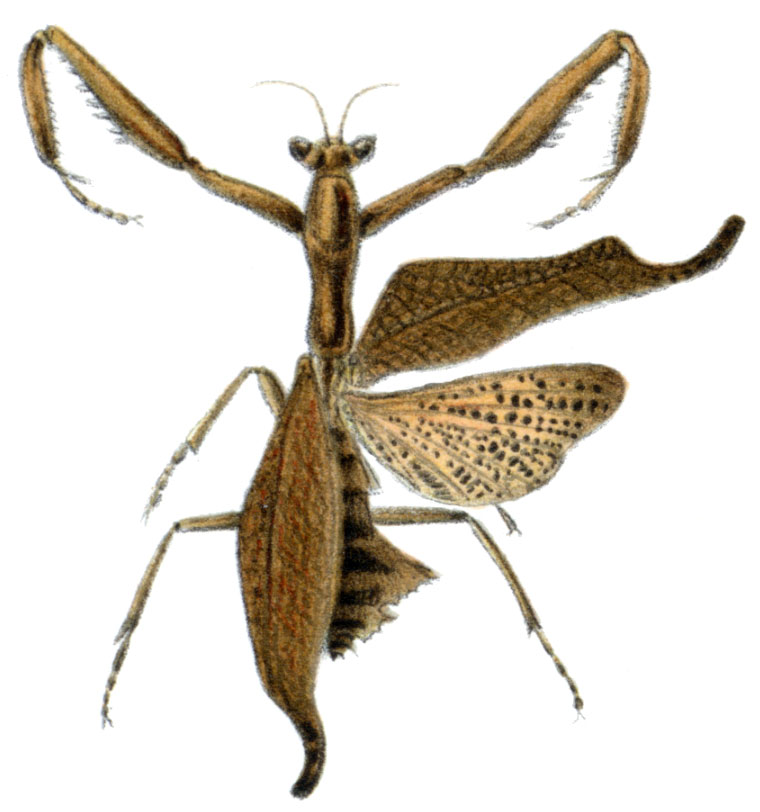
Drawing of an adult female specimen.

A. falcataria is one of many mantis species from various genera that resemble a dead leaf. Acanthops species have an unusual degree of sexual dimorphism compared to other mantids. The flightless female resembles a curled dead leaf and weighs twice as much as the male. It has reduced wings that can be lifted to reveal brightly colored warning colors on the abdomen. The male flies well and has long functional wings that resemble a flat or rolled-up dead leaf at rest. When perched, males often assume a posture where the head, grasping legs and prothorax add to the camouflage by recreating the appearance of a dead leaf's shriveled petiole and stipules.

It is native to South America.

== See also ==
- Dead leaf mantis
- List of mantis genera and species
