= Acanthops falcata =

Scientific classification
- Kingdom: Animalia
- Phylum: Arthropoda
- Clade: Pancrustacea
- Class: Insecta
- Order: Mantodea
- Family: Acanthopidae
- Genus: Acanthops
- Species: A. falcata

Binomial name
- Acanthops falcata Stal, 1877

Synonyms
- Acanthops angulifera Westwood, 1889; Acanthops griffinii Giglio-Tos, 1915

Species of praying mantis

Acanthops falcata, common name South American dead leaf mantis or boxer mantis, is a species of praying mantis in the subfamily Acanthopinae of the family Acanthopidae and is one of many praying mantises from various genera that resembles a dead leaf.

== Description ==
As the common name describes, A. falcata resembles shriveled or dead leaves. It is not to be confused with Acanthops falcataria, a different species in the same genus that is often referred to with the same common name.

Acanthops species have an unusual degree of sexual dimorphism compared to other mantids. The flightless female of A. falcata resembles a curled dead leaf and weighs 400–500 mg. It has reduced wings that can be lifted to reveal brightly colored warning colors on the abdomen. The male weighs under 200 mg and has long functional wings that resemble a flat or rolled-up dead leaf at rest. When perched, males often assume a posture where the head, grasping legs and prothorax add to the camouflage by recreating the appearance of a dead leaf's shriveled petiole and stipules.

Sex differences
Male

Female

== Biology ==
A. falcata is relatively easy to breed in captivity and has become widely distributed through the pet trade. Females have a lifespan of about 6 months at 25-30 °C, laying up to 16 slender oothecae at 8-day intervals. Each ootheca usually contains 25-35 eggs, which hatch after 16–19 days. From hatching to adulthood takes about 2 months and 7 molts. Male adults live up to a month after their final molt, and are often able to escape unharmed after mating, rather than falling prey to the female as in the European mantis.

== See also ==
- Dead leaf mantis
- Acanthops
- List of mantis genera and species
