= Acanthops brunneri =

Scientific classification
- Kingdom: Animalia
- Phylum: Arthropoda
- Clade: Pancrustacea
- Class: Insecta
- Order: Mantodea
- Family: Acanthopidae
- Genus: Acanthops
- Species: A. brunneri

Binomial name
- Acanthops brunneri Saursser, 1871

Species of insect

Acanthops brunneri is a species of praying mantis in the family Acanthopidae.
