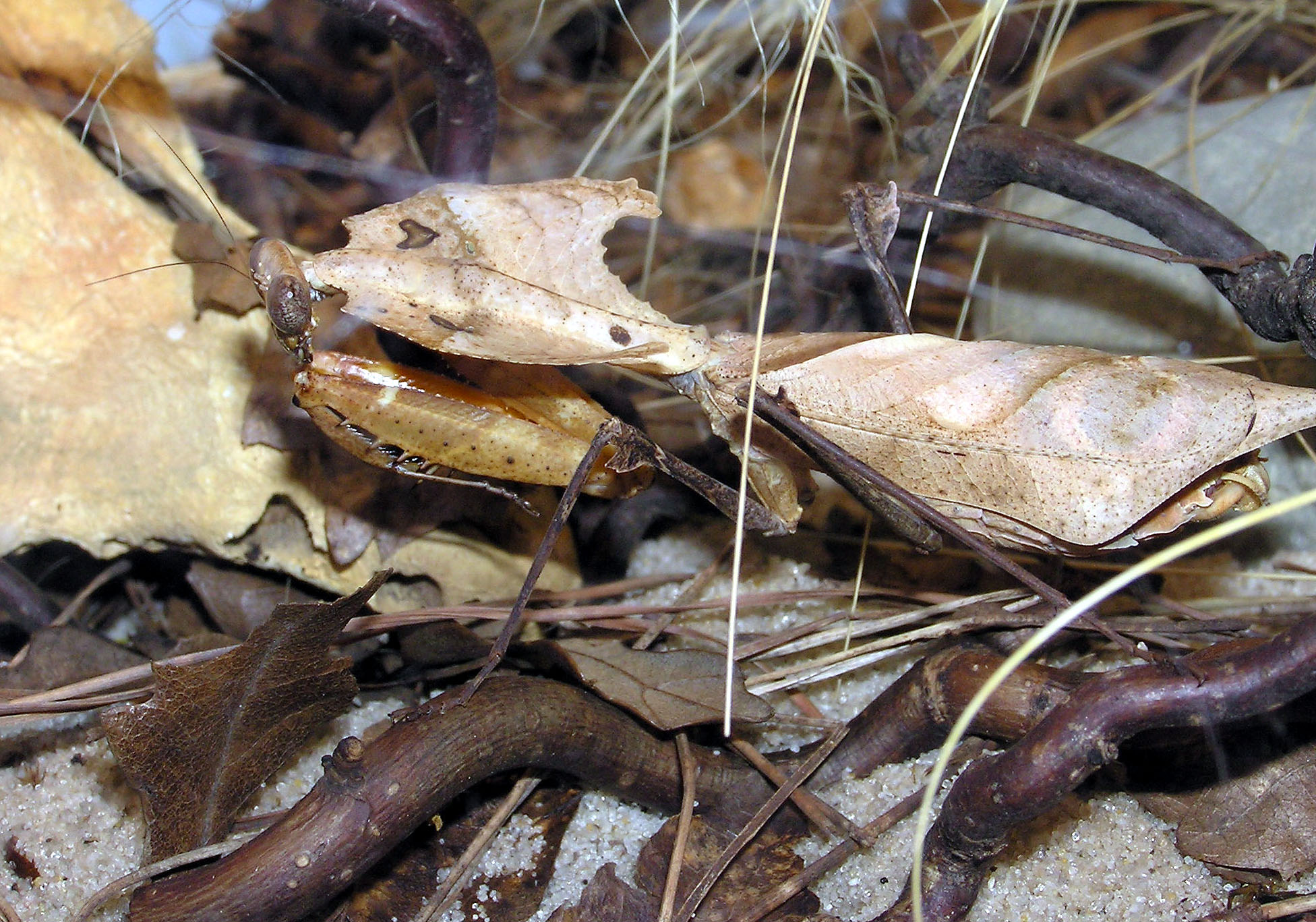
- Adult female at Bristol Zoo, 2007

Scientific classification
- Kingdom: Animalia
- Phylum: Arthropoda
- Clade: Pancrustacea
- Class: Insecta
- Order: Mantodea
- Family: Deroplatyidae
- Genus: Deroplatys
- Species: D. desiccata

Binomial name
- Deroplatys desiccata Westwood, 1839

Synonyms
- Deroplatys arida (Westwood, 1845); Deroplatys desiccata (Beier, 1935); Deroplatys palliata (de Haan, 1842)

= Deroplatys desiccata =

Species of praying mantis

Deroplatys desiccata, known by the common name giant dead leaf mantis, is a praying mantis from Southeast Asia. This is the type species of genus Deroplatys.

== Description ==
D. desiccata takes its common name from its resemblance to dead, leafy vegetation including having a flattened, greatly extended thorax and "intricate leaf patterns" on its wings. This insect varies in color from mottled brown through "pale orangey brown" to a very dark brown that is almost black.

This creature's camouflage is aided by its movements as well as its appearance. When disturbed, it rocks gently as if caught in the breeze. When threatened, it typically falls to the ground and lies motionless. It can also react with a threatening display consisting of "black underwings splayed out, with large eyespots, frightening away unsuspecting predators." The intricate lines on the mantis' body, which serve to look like the natural veins on a leaf, as well as its dark brown colors, are beneficial to the species as it has been shown to avoid the attention of aerial predators or other insects.

As its common name indicates, D. desiccata is larger than other species of dead leaf mantis. Females grow to 75–80 mm long. Displaying the sexual dimorphism typical of mantises, males grow only 65–70 mm long and are substantially smaller and lighter than females. Females' prothorax shields end in a sharp pointed curve on each side while the males have a rounder shape. According to one source, males tend to be more "yellowish" than the darker females.

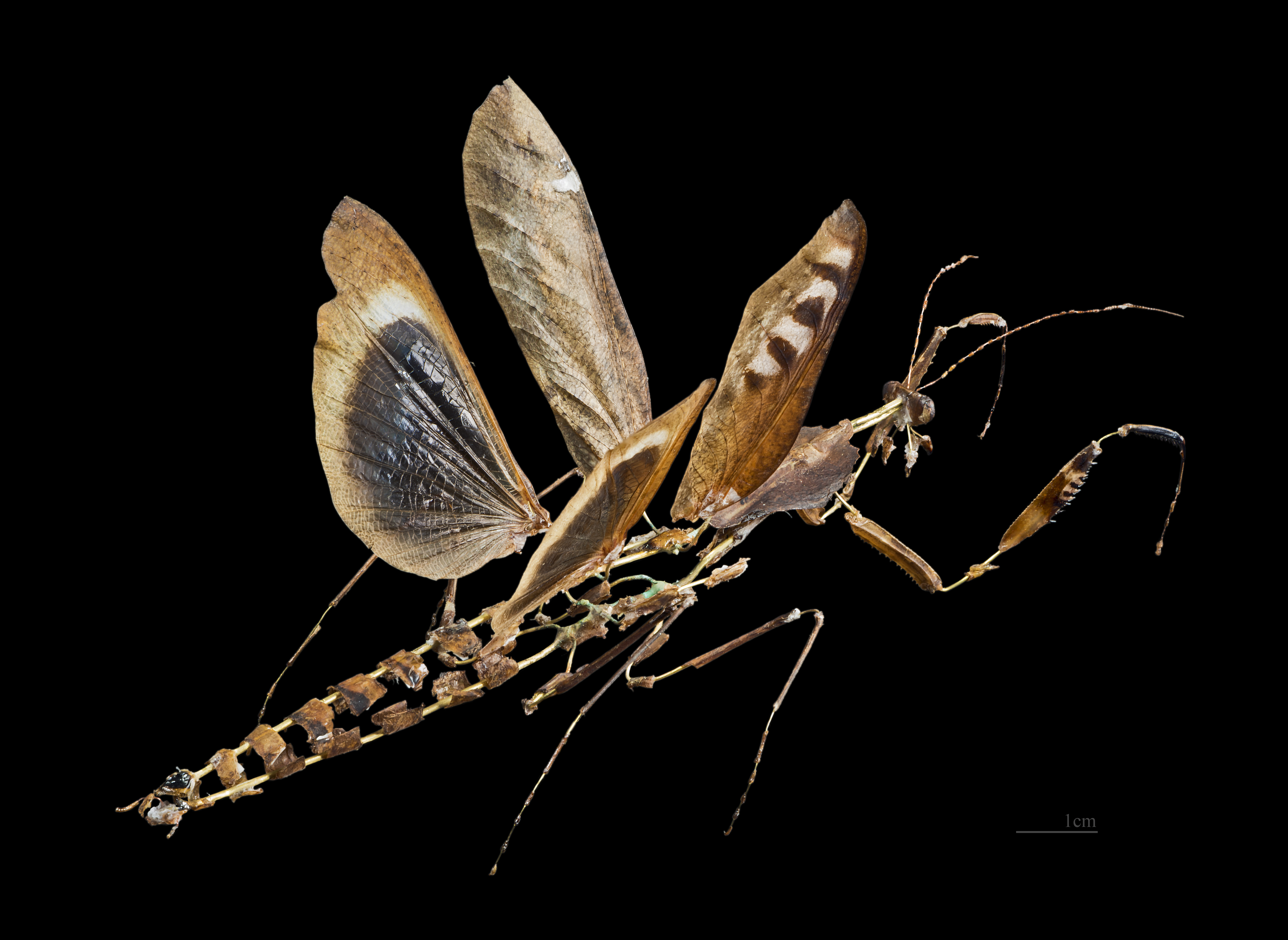
Male prepared in the Beauchene technique

== Range ==
D. desiccata inhabits scrubland and tropical forests of Borneo, Indonesia, Malaysia, Sumatra and the Philippines.

== See also ==
- Dead leaf mantis
