= Dead leaf mantis =

Common name for several praying mantises

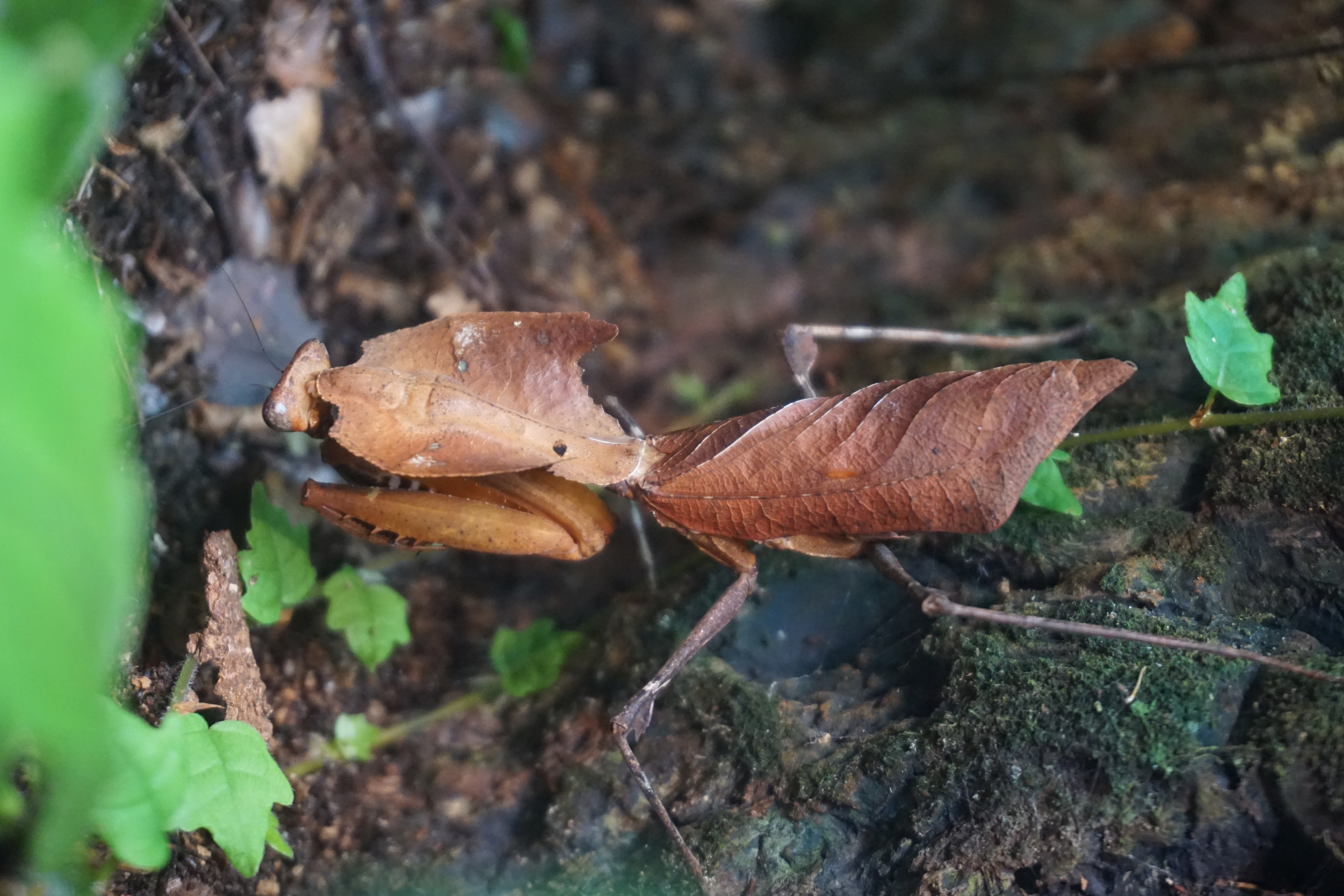
Dead leaf mantis in captivity at San Diego Zoo

Dead leaf mantis is a common name given to various species of praying mantises that mimic dead leaves. It is most often used in reference to species within genus Deroplatys because of their popularity as exotic pets. Examples include D. desiccata (giant dead leaf mantis), D. lobata (Southeast Asian dead leaf mantis), and D. philippinica (Philippines dead leaf mantis). Other species to which the term may apply include Acanthops falcataria (South American dead leaf mantis), A. falcata (South American dead leaf mantis), and Phyllocrania paradoxa (more common known as the ghost mantis).

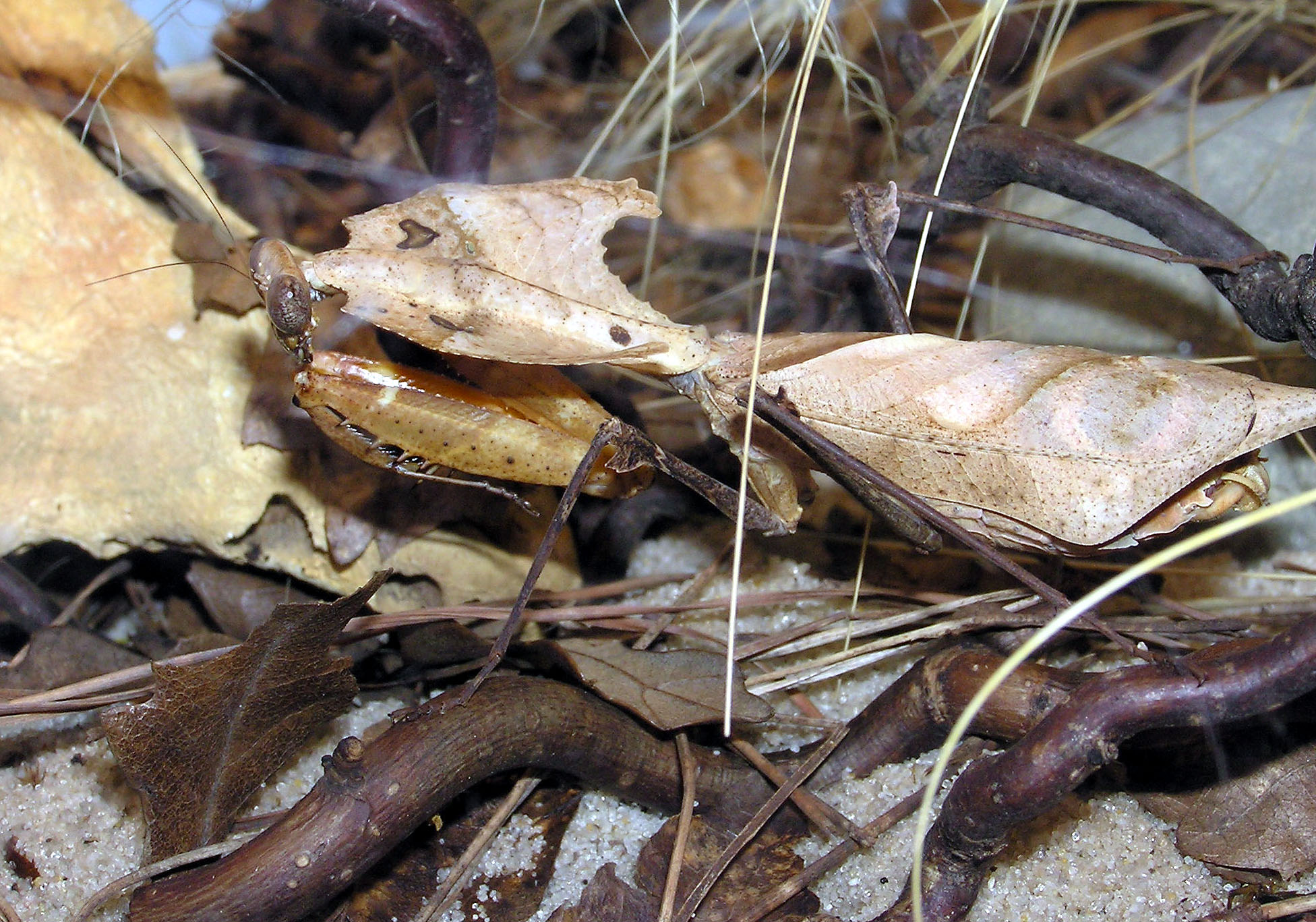
Adult female Deroplatys desiccata photographed at Bristol Zoo in 2007

== See also ==
- Flower mantis
- Leaf mantis
- Shield mantis
- Grass mantis
- Stick mantis
- Acanthops
- List of mantis genera and species
