= Danuria impannosa =

Scientific classification
- Kingdom: Animalia
- Phylum: Arthropoda
- Clade: Pancrustacea
- Class: Insecta
- Order: Mantodea
- Family: Deroplatyidae
- Genus: Danuria
- Species: D. impannosa

Binomial name
- Danuria impannosa Karsch, 1889

Synonyms
- Danuria schweinfurthi Werner, 1907

Species of praying mantis

Danuria impannosa is a species of praying mantis in the family Deroplatyidae. It is known from Ethiopia and Sudan.

== See also ==
- List of mantis genera and species
