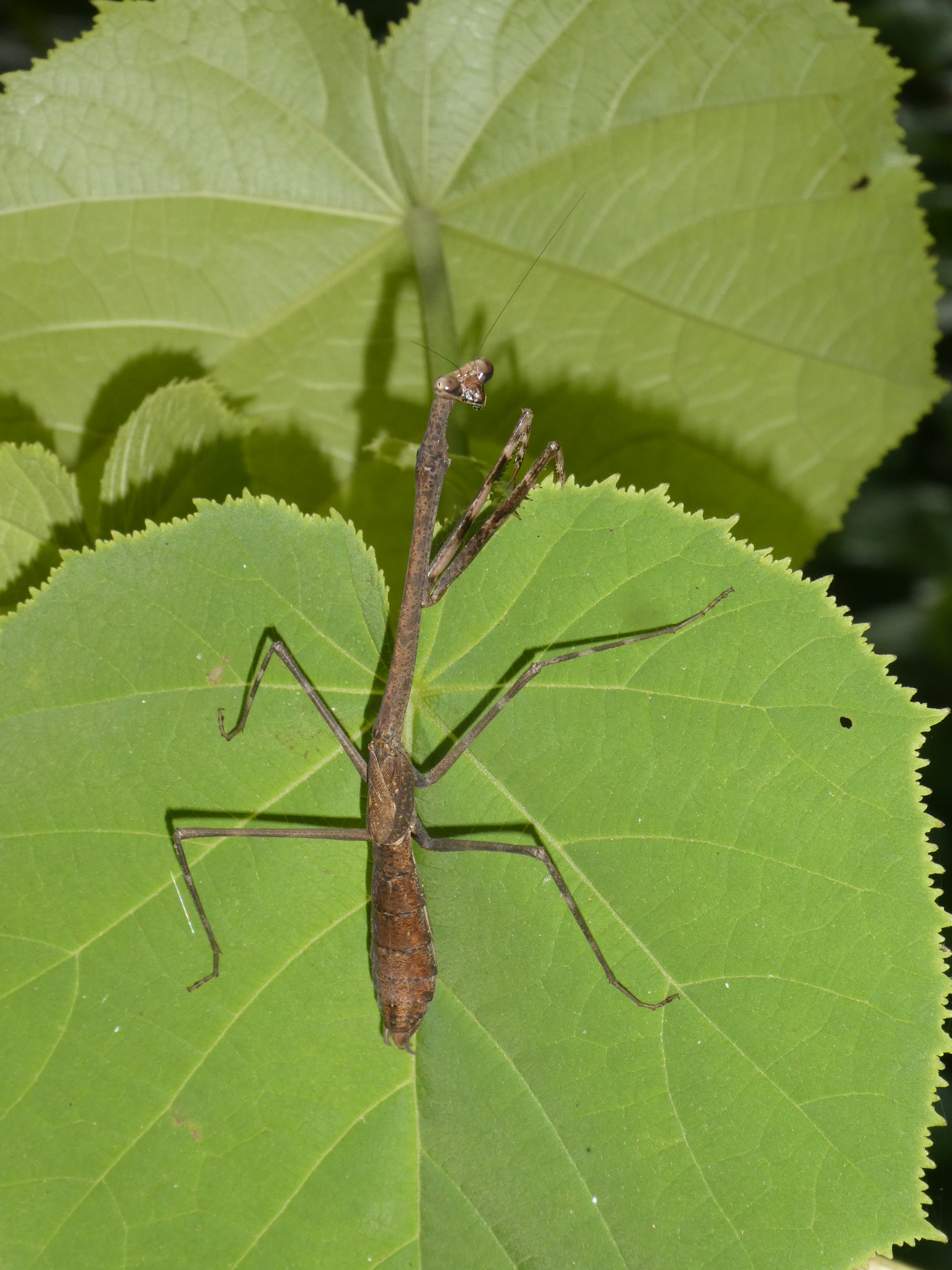
- E. macrops female in Cat Tien National Park

Scientific classification
- Kingdom: Animalia
- Phylum: Arthropoda
- Class: Insecta
- Order: Mantodea
- Family: Deroplatyidae
- Genus: Euchomenella
- Species: E. macrops

Binomial name
- Euchomenella macrops Saussure, 1870

Synonyms
- Originally described under the genus names Miopteryx then Euchomena Saussure, 1871

= Euchomenella macrops =

Species of praying mantis

Euchomenella macrops is a species of praying mantis in the family Deroplatyidae.

This "giraffe mantis" species can be found in the tropical forests of southern Vietnam. Females are brachypterous but males are capable of flight.
