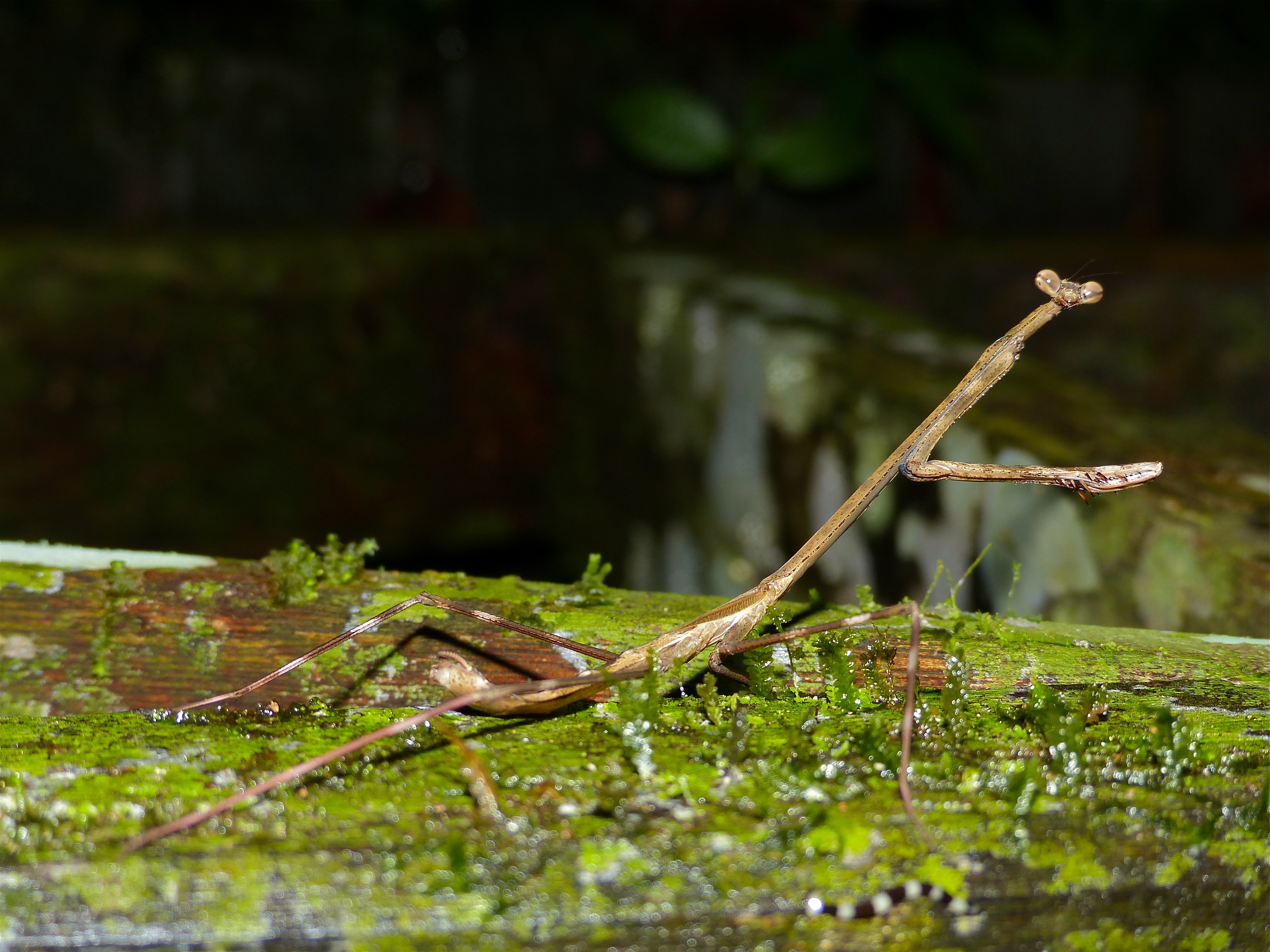
- E. heteroptera female in Niah National Park

Scientific classification
- Kingdom: Animalia
- Phylum: Arthropoda
- Clade: Pancrustacea
- Class: Insecta
- Order: Mantodea
- Family: Deroplatyidae
- Genus: Euchomenella
- Species: E. heteroptera

Binomial name
- Euchomenella heteroptera de Haan, 1842

= Euchomenella heteroptera =

Species of insect

Euchomenella heteroptera is a species of mantis, also known as the Giraffe Mantis (due to the abnormal length of their thorax), in the family Deroplatyidae.

== Description ==
The females are usually larger in size compared to the males, growing to about 3.5-4 inches, while the males grow to roughly around 2.5-3 inches.

These mantises can vary in color between brown or grey, including red or pink on their raptorials and white spots along their abdomen. Because of their extremely slim stature, these mantises are also excellent at imitating sticks.
