= Danuria serratodentata =

Scientific classification
- Kingdom: Animalia
- Phylum: Arthropoda
- Clade: Pancrustacea
- Class: Insecta
- Order: Mantodea
- Family: Deroplatyidae
- Genus: Danuria
- Species: D. serratodentata

Binomial name
- Danuria serratodentata Karsch, 1889

Species of praying mantis

Danuria serratodentata is a species of praying mantis in the family Deroplatyidae. It is known from Angola.

== See also ==
- List of mantis genera and species
