= Euchomenella apicalis =

Scientific classification
- Kingdom: Animalia
- Phylum: Arthropoda
- Clade: Pancrustacea
- Class: Insecta
- Order: Mantodea
- Family: Deroplatyidae
- Genus: Euchomenella
- Species: E. apicalis

Binomial name
- Euchomenella apicalis Werner, 1922

Species of mantis

Euchomenella macrops is a species of mantis in the family Deroplatyidae. It is found on the islands of Sumatra and Java in Indonesia.
