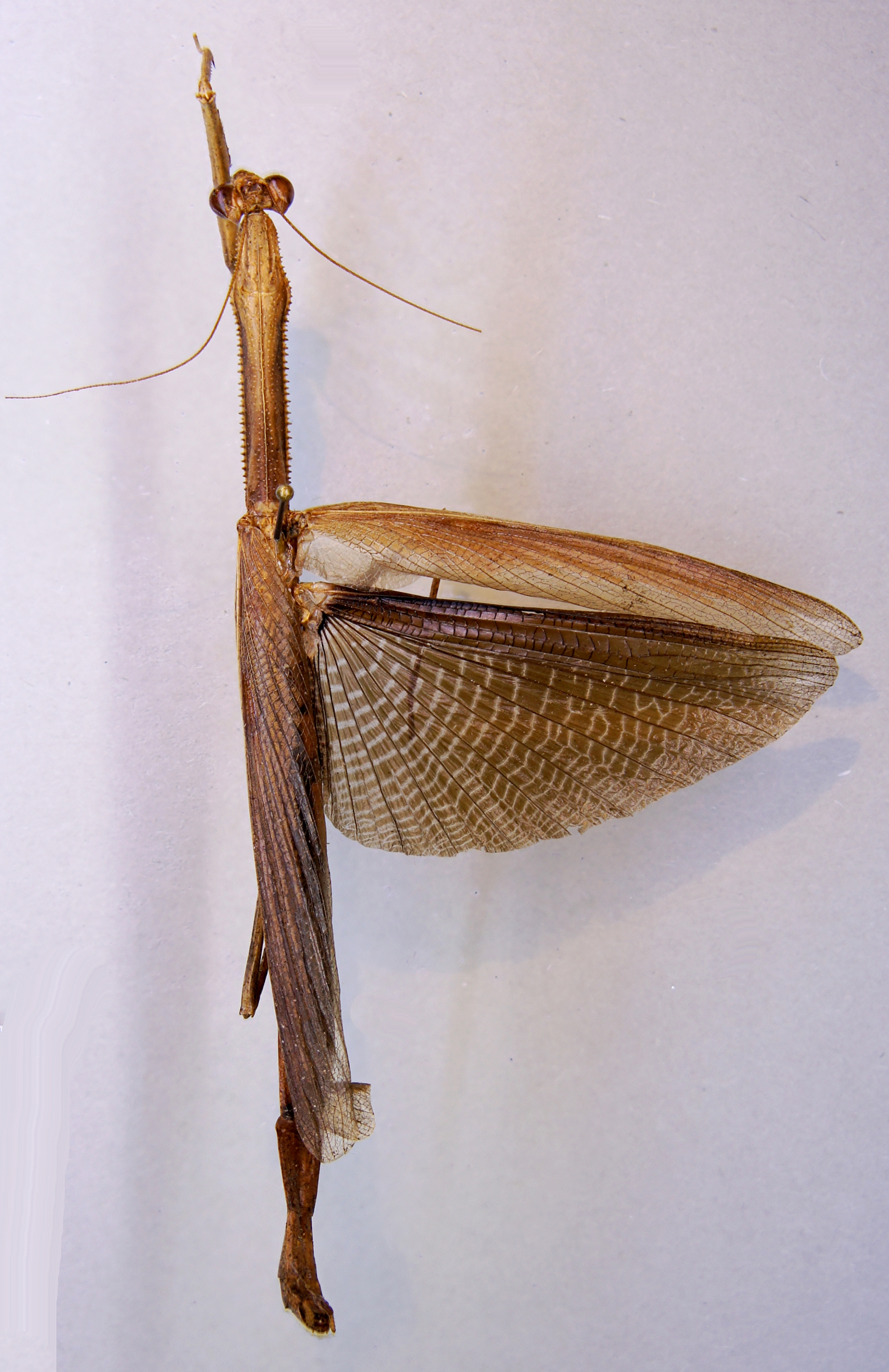
- Danuria buchholzi from Zoologische Staatssammlung München

Scientific classification
- Kingdom: Animalia
- Phylum: Arthropoda
- Clade: Pancrustacea
- Class: Insecta
- Order: Mantodea
- Family: Deroplatyidae
- Genus: Danuria
- Species: D. buchholzi

Binomial name
- Danuria buchholzi Gerstaecker, 1883

= Danuria buchholzi =

Species of praying mantis

Danuria buchholzi is a species of praying mantis in the family Deroplatyidae. It occurs in West Africa.

== See also ==
- List of mantis genera and species
