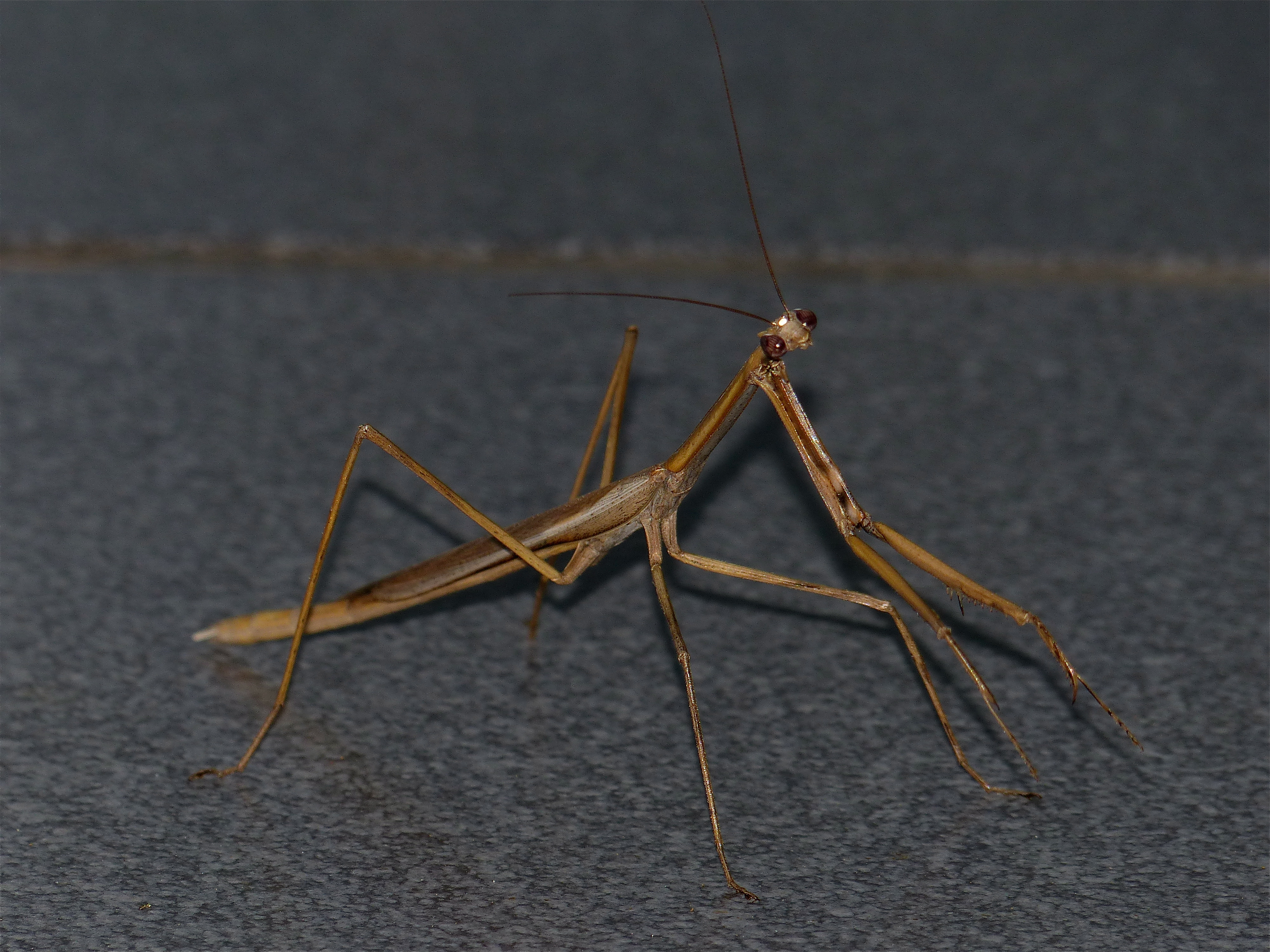

Scientific classification
- Kingdom: Animalia
- Phylum: Arthropoda
- Clade: Pancrustacea
- Class: Insecta
- Order: Mantodea
- Family: Deroplatyidae
- Genus: Danuria
- Species: D. thunbergi

Binomial name
- Danuria thunbergi Stål, 1856

= Danuria thunbergi =

Species of praying mantis

Danuria thunbergi is a species of praying mantis in the family Deroplatyidae. It is known from South Africa and Zimbabwe.

The holotype measures 75 mm (3.0 in) in length.

== See also ==
- List of mantis genera and species
