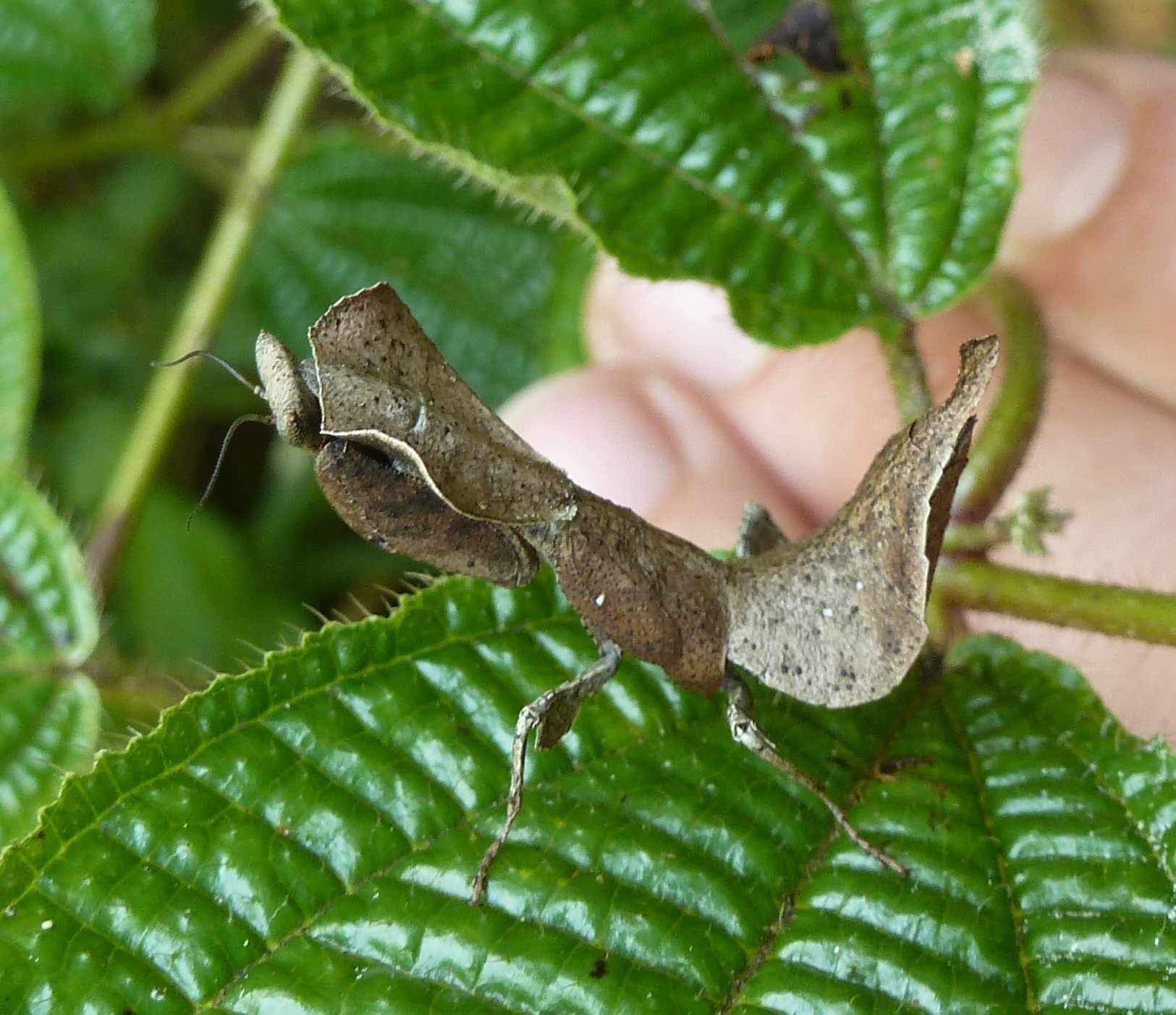
- Brancsikia aeroplana

Scientific classification
- Domain: Eukaryota
- Kingdom: Animalia
- Phylum: Arthropoda
- Class: Insecta
- Order: Mantodea
- Family: Majangidae
- Genus: Brancsikia
- Species: B. aeroplana

Binomial name
- Brancsikia aeroplana (Lamberton, 1911)

= Brancsikia aeroplana =

Species of praying mantis

Brancsikia areoplana is a species of praying mantis from Madagascar, in the family Majangidae.

== See also ==
- List of mantis genera and species
- Dead leaf mantis
