= Danuria congica =

Scientific classification
- Kingdom: Animalia
- Phylum: Arthropoda
- Clade: Pancrustacea
- Class: Insecta
- Order: Mantodea
- Family: Deroplatyidae
- Genus: Danuria
- Species: D. congica

Binomial name
- Danuria congica Giglio-Tos, 1917

Species of praying mantis

Danuria congica is a species of praying mantis in the family Deroplatyidae. It is known from Belgian Congo.

The holotype, a female, measures 90 mm (3.5 in) in length.

== See also ==
- List of mantis genera and species
