= Danuria angusticollis =

Scientific classification
- Kingdom: Animalia
- Phylum: Arthropoda
- Clade: Pancrustacea
- Class: Insecta
- Order: Mantodea
- Family: Deroplatyidae
- Genus: Danuria
- Species: D. angusticollis

Binomial name
- Danuria angusticollis Beier, 1931

Species of praying mantis

Danuria angusticollis is a species of praying mantis in the family Deroplatyidae. It is known from Tanzania.

== See also ==
- List of mantis genera and species
