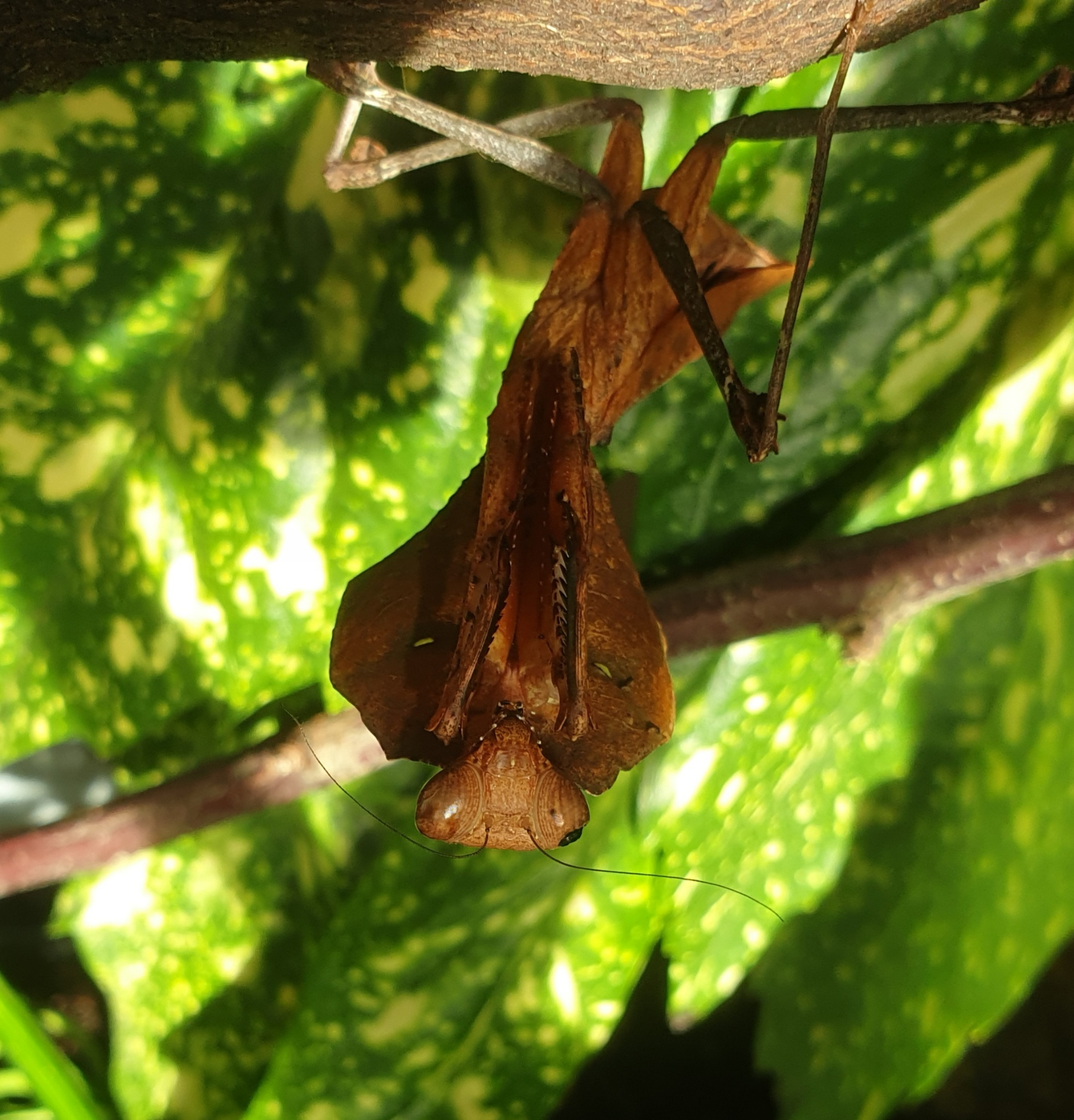
- Adult Deroplatys

Scientific classification
- Kingdom: Animalia
- Phylum: Arthropoda
- Clade: Pancrustacea
- Class: Insecta
- Order: Mantodea
- Family: Deroplatyidae
- Subfamily: Deroplatyinae; Giglio-Tos, 1919

Tribes and genera
- see text

= Deroplatyinae =

Subfamily of praying mantises

Deroplatyinae is a subfamily in the new (2019) family Deroplatyidae, containing species found in South-East Asia.

== Tribes and selected genera ==
The Mantodea Species File lists the following:

- tribe Deroplatyini
  - subtribe Deroplatyina
    - Deroplatys Westwood, 1839
  - subtribe Pseudempusina
    - Mythomantis Giglio-Tos, 1916
    - Pseudempusa Brunner v. W., 1893
- tribe Euchomenellini
    - Euchomenella Giglio-Tos, 1916
    - Indomenella Roy, 2008
    - Phasmomantella Vermeersch, 2018
    - Tagalomantis Hebard, 1920

Note: the genus Brancsikia Saussure & Zehntner, 1895 is now placed in the family Majangidae.

== See also ==
- List of mantis genera and species
