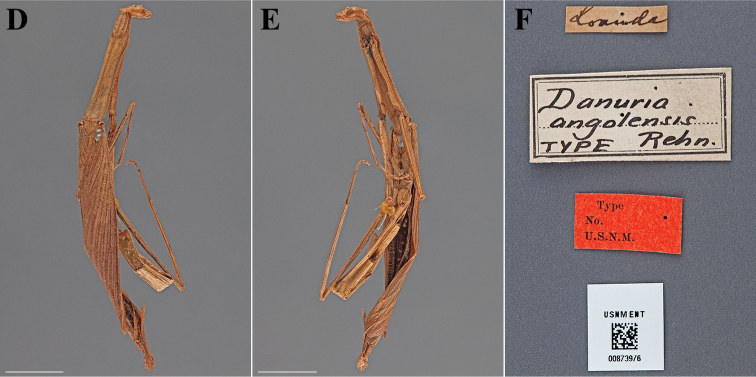
- Holotype of Danuria angolensis, a junior synonym of Danuria barbozae

Scientific classification
- Kingdom: Animalia
- Phylum: Arthropoda
- Clade: Pancrustacea
- Class: Insecta
- Order: Mantodea
- Family: Deroplatyidae
- Genus: Danuria
- Species: D. barbozae

Binomial name
- Danuria barbozae Bolívar, 1889

Synonyms
- Danuria angolensis Rehn, 1912; Danuria superciliaris Gerstaecker, 1869

= Danuria barbozae =

Species of praying mantis

Danuria barbozae is a species of praying mantis in the family Deroplatyidae. It is known from Angola.

The holotype, a female, measures 87 mm (3.4 in) in length.

== See also ==
- List of mantis genera and species
