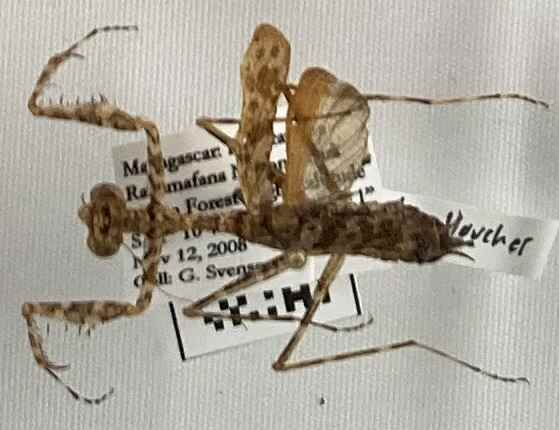

Scientific classification
- Kingdom: Animalia
- Phylum: Arthropoda
- Clade: Pancrustacea
- Class: Insecta
- Order: Mantodea
- Family: Majangidae
- Genus: Liturgusella
- Species: L. malagassa

Binomial name
- Liturgusella malagassa Saussure & Zehntner, 1895

= Liturgusella malagassa =

Species of praying mantis

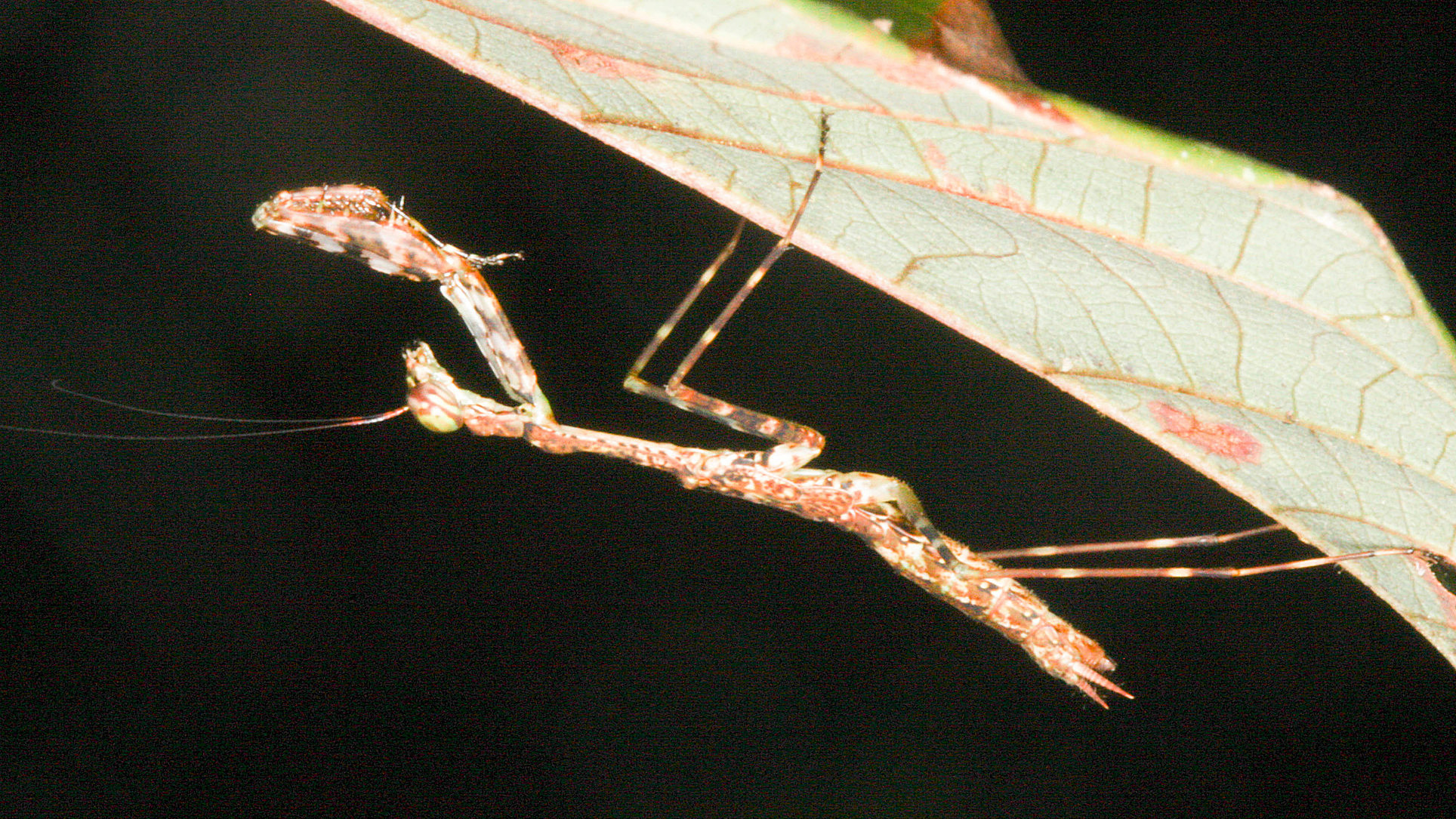
Liturgusella malagassa as photographed in the wild by Scott Loarie, Alaotra-Mangoro.

Liturgusella malagassa is a species of praying mantis in the family Liturgusidae. It was first described by Swiss entomologists Saussure and Leo Zehntner in 1895.

== Taxonomy ==
- Liturgusella malagassa* belongs to the order Mantodea, class Insecta, and phylum Arthropoda. It is the only species currently recognized in the genus Liturgusella.

== Classification and Recognition ==
The species is listed in the Tree of Life Web Project, which recognizes it as part of the family Liturgusidae, based on the classification system established by Ehrmann (2002).

== Distribution ==
The species is known to inhabit Madagascar.
