= Euchomenella moluccarum =

Scientific classification
- Kingdom: Animalia
- Phylum: Arthropoda
- Clade: Pancrustacea
- Class: Insecta
- Order: Mantodea
- Family: Deroplatyidae
- Genus: Euchomenella
- Species: E. moluccarum

Binomial name
- Euchomenella moluccarum Saussure, 1872

Species of mantis

Euchomenella moluccarum is a species of mantis in the family Deroplatyidae. It is found in the Maluku Islands and in Malaysia.
