= Phasmomantella =

Scientific classification
- Kingdom: Animalia
- Phylum: Arthropoda
- Clade: Pancrustacea
- Class: Insecta
- Order: Mantodea
- Family: Deroplatyidae
- Subfamily: Deroplatyinae
- Tribe: Euchomenellini
- Genus: Phasmomantella; Vermeersch, 2018

Genus of praying mantises

Phasmomantella is a genus of praying mantids placed in the tribe Euchomenellini and family Deroplatyidae. The two known species appear to be endemic to Vietnam.

== Species ==
The Mantodea Species File lists:

- Phasmomantella pallida (Roy, 2001) - reassigned from Euchomenella (Nha Trang, Vietnam)
- Phasmomantella nuichuana Vermeersch, 2018 – type species (Núi Chúa National Park, Vietnam)
