= Danuria gracilis =

Scientific classification
- Kingdom: Animalia
- Phylum: Arthropoda
- Clade: Pancrustacea
- Class: Insecta
- Order: Mantodea
- Family: Deroplatyidae
- Genus: Danuria
- Species: D. gracilis

Binomial name
- Danuria gracilis (Schulthess-Schindler, 1898)

Synonyms
- Popa gracilis Schulthess-Schindler, 1898; Danuria kuangana Giglio-Tos, 1914

Species of praying mantis

Danuria gracilis is a species of praying mantis in the family Deroplatyidae. It is known from Somalia and the Democratic Republic of Congo.

The holotype measures 74 mm (2.9 in) in length.

== See also ==
- List of mantis genera and species
