= Euchomenella thoracica =

Scientific classification
- Kingdom: Animalia
- Phylum: Arthropoda
- Clade: Pancrustacea
- Class: Insecta
- Order: Mantodea
- Family: Deroplatyidae
- Genus: Euchomenella
- Species: E. horacica

Binomial name
- Euchomenella horacica de Haan, 1842

Species of mantis

Euchomenella thoracica is a species of mantis in the family Deroplatyidae. It is found on the Sunda Islands in Indonesia.
