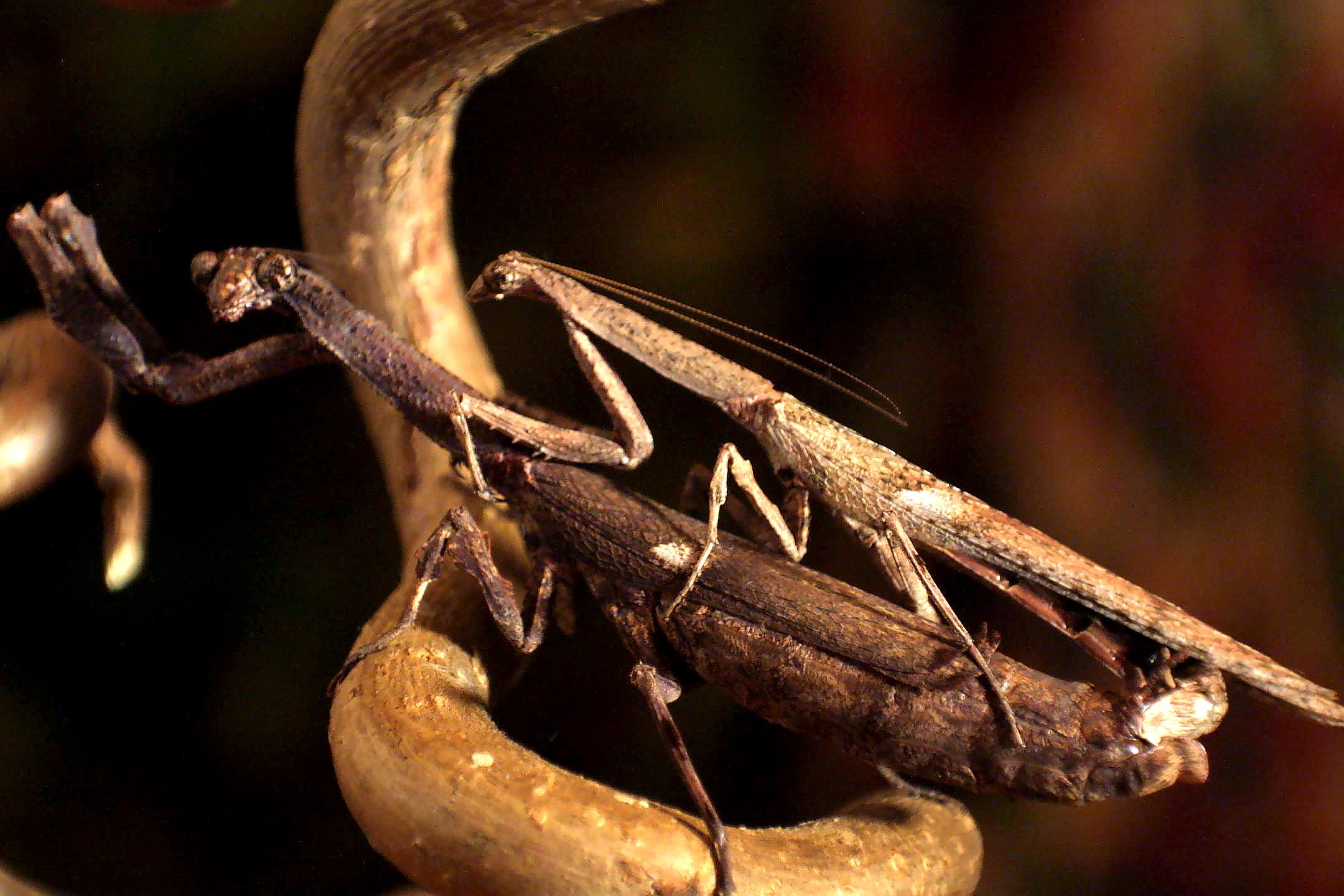
- Popa spurca: female & male

Scientific classification
- Kingdom: Animalia
- Phylum: Arthropoda
- Clade: Pancrustacea
- Class: Insecta
- Order: Mantodea
- Family: Deroplatyidae
- Subfamily: Popinae
- Genus: Popa; Serville, 1839

= Popa (mantis) =

Genus of praying mantises

Popa is an African genus of praying mantises in the subfamily Popinae and new (2019) family Deroplatyidae.

== Species ==
The Mantodea Species File lists two species:

- Popa gracilis Schulthess-Schindler, 1898
- Popa spurca Stal, 1856
