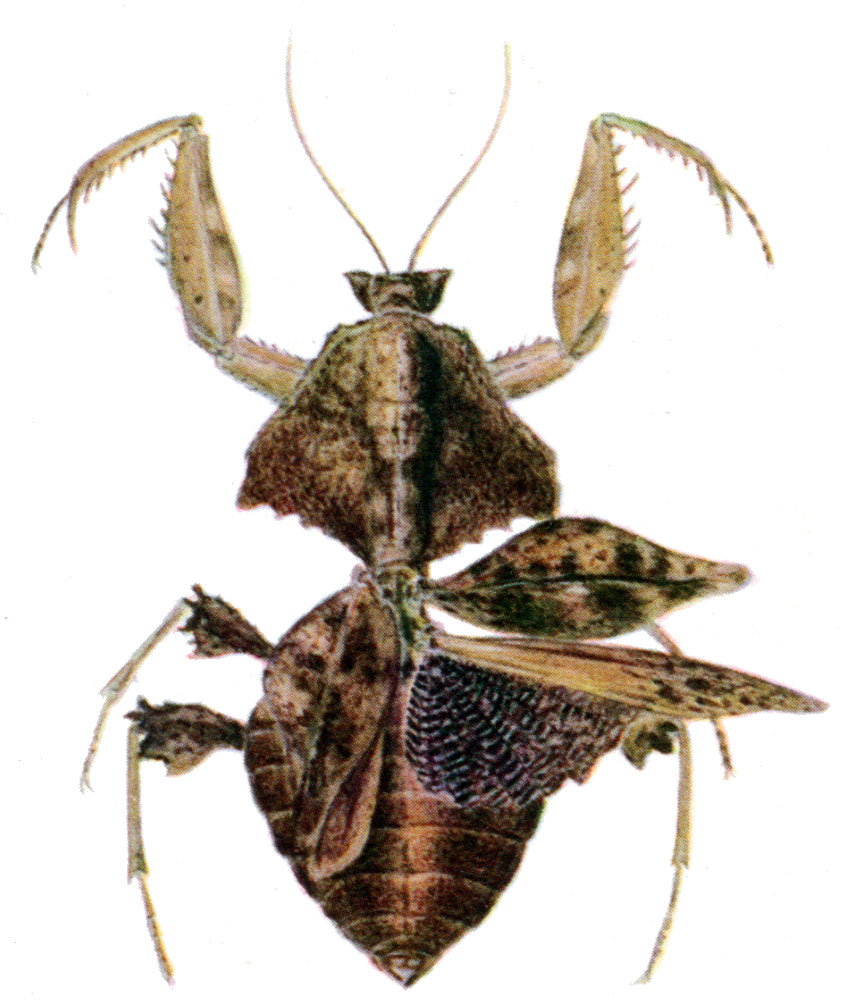
- Brancsikia freyi female

Scientific classification
- Kingdom: Animalia
- Phylum: Arthropoda
- Class: Insecta
- Order: Mantodea
- Family: Majangidae
- Subfamily: Brancsikiinae
- Genus: Brancsikia
- Species: B. freyi

Binomial name
- Brancsikia freyi (Brancsik, 1893)

Synonyms
- Brancsikia simplex Beier, 1935

= Brancsikia freyi =

Species of praying mantis

Brancsikia freyi is the type species in its genus of praying mantids: in the family Majangidae.

== See also ==
- Dead leaf mantis
