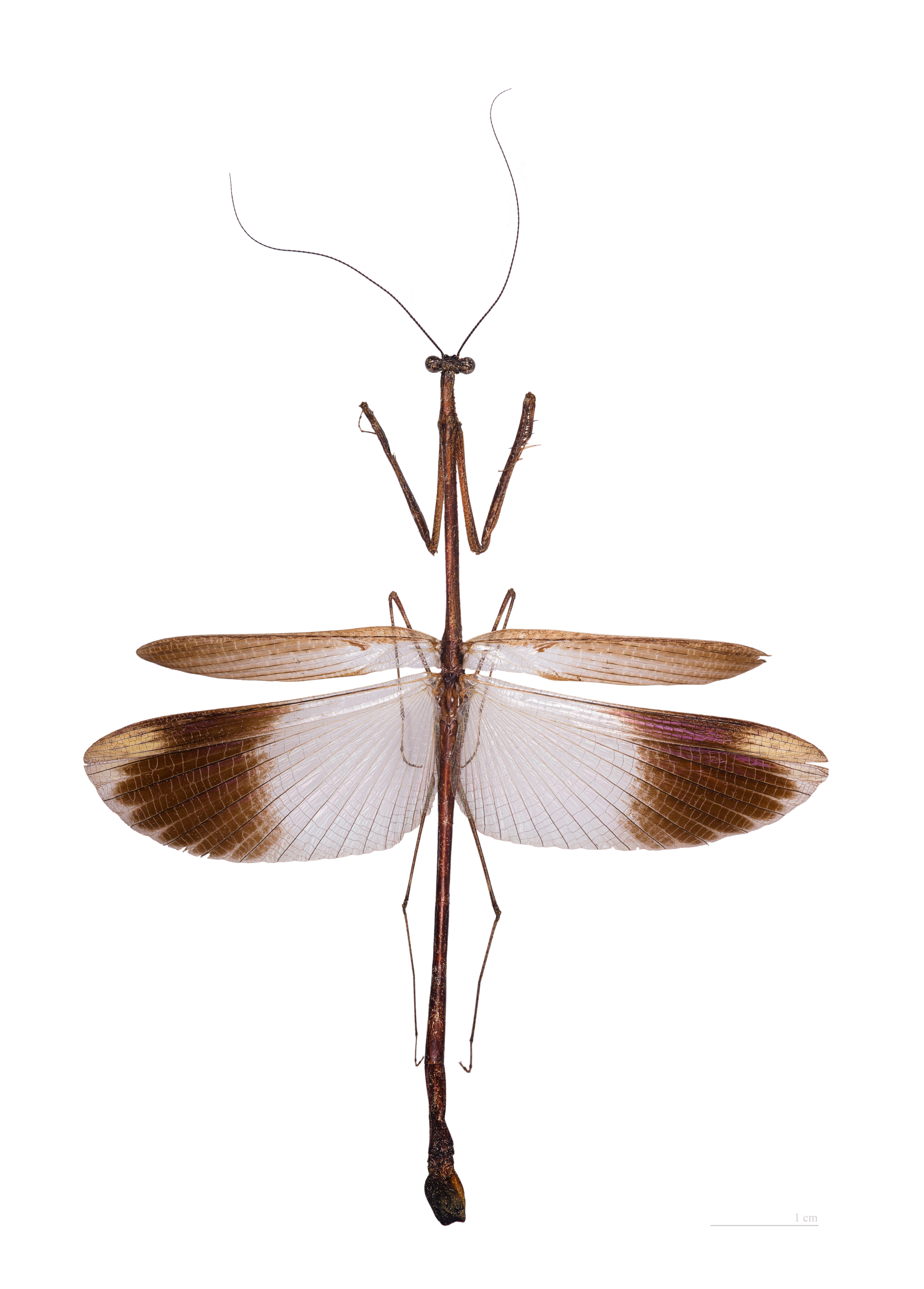
- Angela guianensis (male)

Scientific classification
- Kingdom: Animalia
- Phylum: Arthropoda
- Clade: Pancrustacea
- Class: Insecta
- Order: Mantodea
- Family: Angelidae; Giglio-Tos, 1927
- Genus: Angela; Serville, 1839

Synonyms
- Thespoides Chopard, 1916

= Angela (mantis) =

Genus of praying mantises

Angela is a genus of praying mantises found in tropical Central and South America.

== Taxonomy and systematics ==
Angela is the only genus in the family Angelidae, erected by Ermanno Giglio-Tos, which was formerly classified as a tribe or subfamily of the family Mantidae and for a brief period also included the restored Asian tribe Euchomenellini.

=== Species ===
As of April 2026 The Mantodea Species File includes:

1. Angela armata de Haan, 1842
2. Angela brachyptera Stoll, 1813
3. Angela championi Saussure & Zehntner, 1894
4. Angela decolor Chopard, 1913
5. Angela guianensis Rehn, 1906
6. Angela inermis Werner, 1927
7. Angela lemoulti Chopard, 1910
8. Angela maxima Chopard, 1910
9. Angela minor Giglio-Tos, 1916
10. Angela miranda Saussure, 1871
11. Angela ornata de Haan, 1842
12. Angela perpulchra Westwood, 1889
13. Angela peruviana Giglio-Tos, 1916
14. Angela purpurascens Olivier, 1792
15. Angela quinquemaculata Olivier, 1792
16. Angela saussurii Giglio-Tos, 1927
17. Angela subhyalina Chopard, 1913
18. Angela trifasciata Stal, 1877 (2 subspecies)
19. Angela werneri Chopard, 1913
