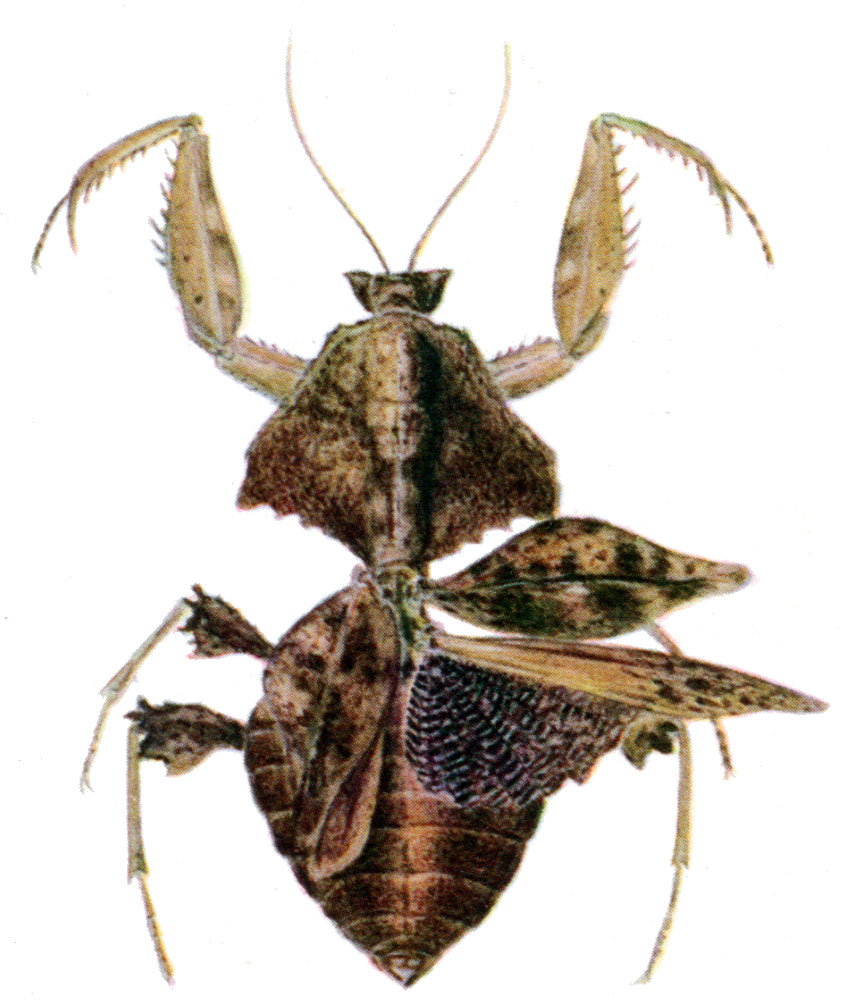
- Adult female Brancsikia freyi

Scientific classification
- Kingdom: Animalia
- Phylum: Arthropoda
- Clade: Pancrustacea
- Class: Insecta
- Order: Mantodea
- Superfamily: Epaphroditoidea
- Family: Majangidae
- Subfamily: Brancsikiinae
- Genus: Brancsikia; Saussure & Zehntner (1895)

Species
- See text

= Brancsikia =

Genus of praying mantises

Brancsikia is a genus of praying mantises in the new (2019) family Majangidae and the monotypic subfamily Brancsikiinae; it was previously placed in the Deroplatyinae.

== Species ==
There are now two species in the genus Brancsikia, listed in the Mantodea Species File:

- Brancsikia aeroplana Lamberton, 1911
- Brancsikia freyi Brancsik, 1893 (synonym: Brancsikia simplex) - type species

== See also ==
- Dead leaf mantis
