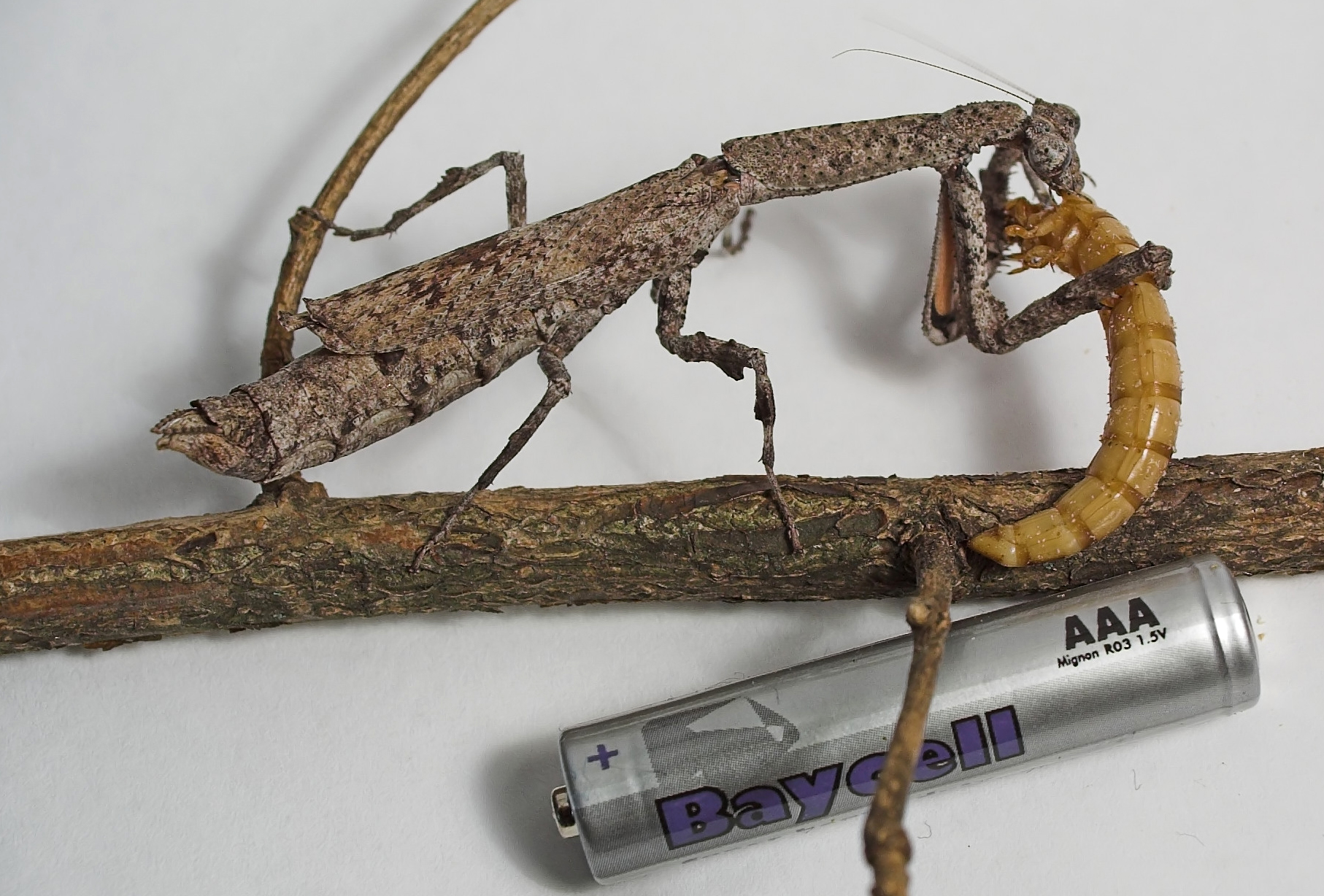
- Popa spurca eating a mealworm; the AAA battery is shown for size comparison

Scientific classification
- Kingdom: Animalia
- Phylum: Arthropoda
- Clade: Pancrustacea
- Class: Insecta
- Order: Mantodea
- Superfamily: Mantoidea
- Family: Deroplatyidae
- Subfamily: Popinae
- Genus: Popa
- Species: P. spurca

Binomial name
- Popa spurca Stål, 1856

= Popa spurca =

Species of praying mantis

Popa spurca, also known as the African twig mantis, is a species of mantis native to Africa. It takes its common name from its resemblance to twig from a woody plant and grows up to 8 centimetres (3.1 in) long if female or 7 cm (2.8 in) long if male.

== See also ==
- List of mantis genera and species
- African mantis
- Stick mantis
