= Angela armata =

Scientific classification
- Domain: Eukaryota
- Kingdom: Animalia
- Phylum: Arthropoda
- Class: Insecta
- Order: Mantodea
- Family: Angelidae
- Genus: Angela
- Species: A. armata

Binomial name
- Angela armata de Hann, 1842

Synonyms
- Angela fulgida (Saussure, 1872)

Species of praying mantis

Angela armata is a species of praying mantis from the genus Angela of the family Mantidae. Specimens can be found in regions of Brazil, Costa Rica, Ecuador, French Guiana and Peru.
