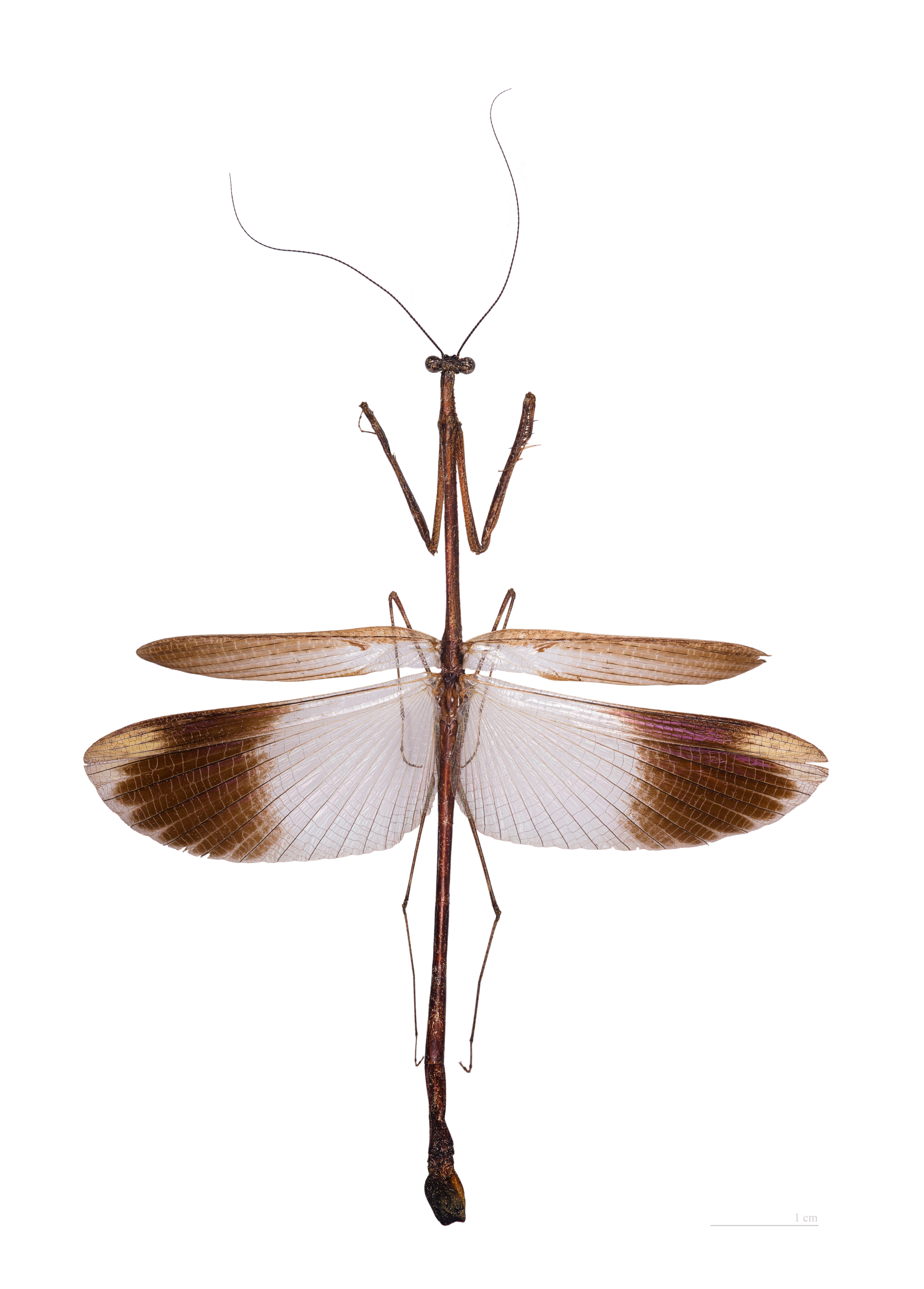
- A male specimen of Angela guianensis - Muséum de Toulouse

Scientific classification
- Domain: Eukaryota
- Kingdom: Animalia
- Phylum: Arthropoda
- Class: Insecta
- Order: Mantodea
- Family: Angelidae
- Genus: Angela
- Species: A. guianensis

Binomial name
- Angela guianensis Rehn, 1906

Synonyms
- Angela infuscata (Chopard, 1911); Angela bolivari Chopard, 1916

= Angela guianensis =

Species of praying mantis

Angela guianensis is a species of praying mantis from the genus Angela, within the family Mantidae. It was first described by the entomologist Rehn in 1906.

Specimens can be found in French Guiana, Bolivia, Brazil, Costa Rica, Guyana, Colombia, Surinam, and Venezuela.
