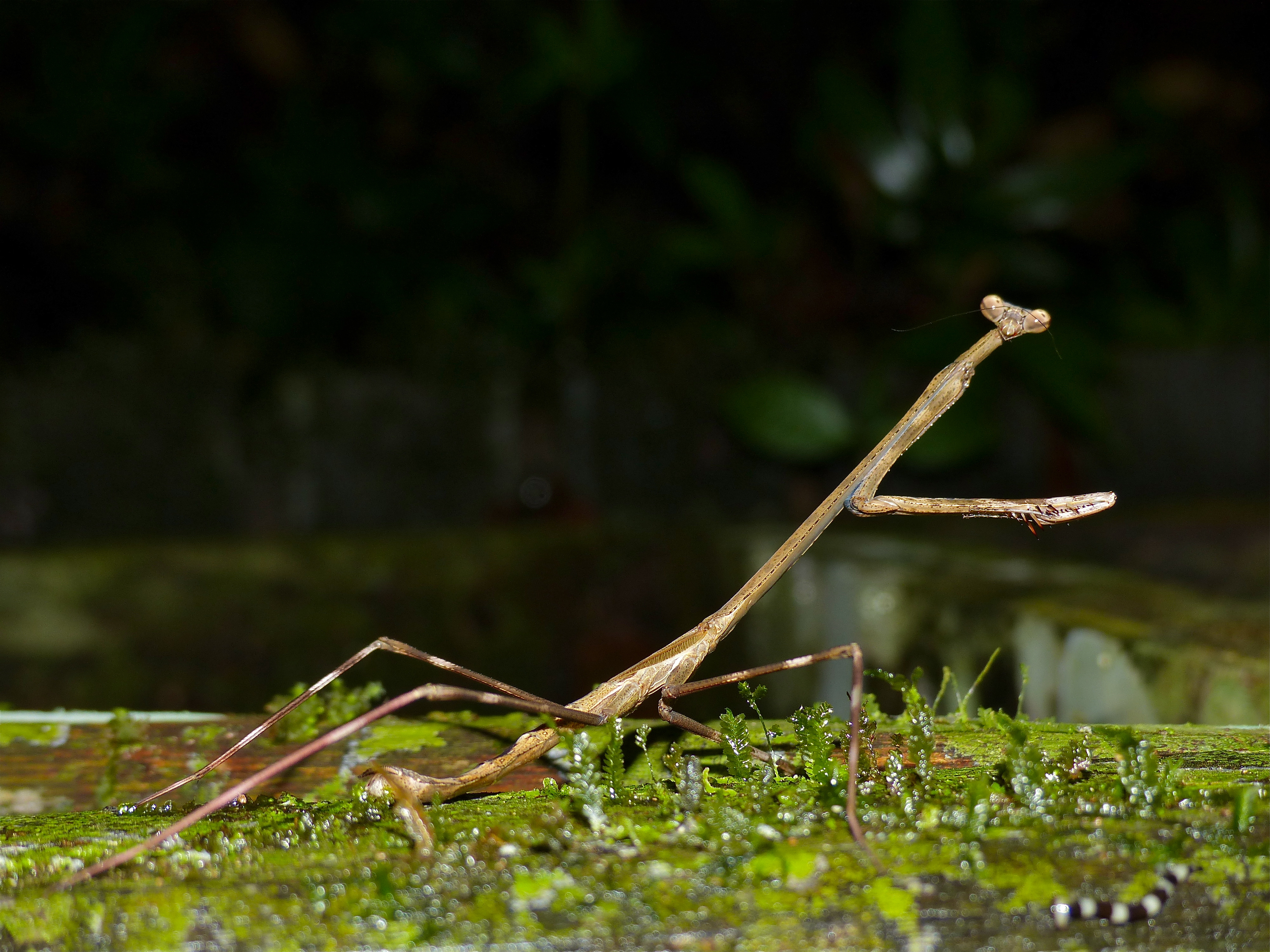
- Euchomenella heteroptera female

Scientific classification
- Kingdom: Animalia
- Phylum: Arthropoda
- Clade: Pancrustacea
- Class: Insecta
- Order: Mantodea
- Family: Deroplatyidae
- Subfamily: Deroplatyinae
- Tribe: Euchomenellini; Giglio-Tos, 1916

Genera
- see text

= Euchomenellini =

Tribe of mantises

Euchomenellini is a recently (2017) restored, southeast Asian tribe of mantises. It is now placed in the new (2019) family Deroplatyidae, genera having previously been placed in the Angelidae: which now consists only of neotropical mantises.

== Genera ==
With the discovery of Phasmomantella, the following are included:

- Euchomenella Giglio-Tos, 1916 (Vietnam, Borneo)
- Indomenella Roy, 2008 (India) - monotypic I. indica (Ghate & Mukherjee, 2004)
- Phasmomantella Vermeersch, 2018 (Vietnam: 2 spp.)
- Tagalomantis Hebard, 1920 (Philippines)
