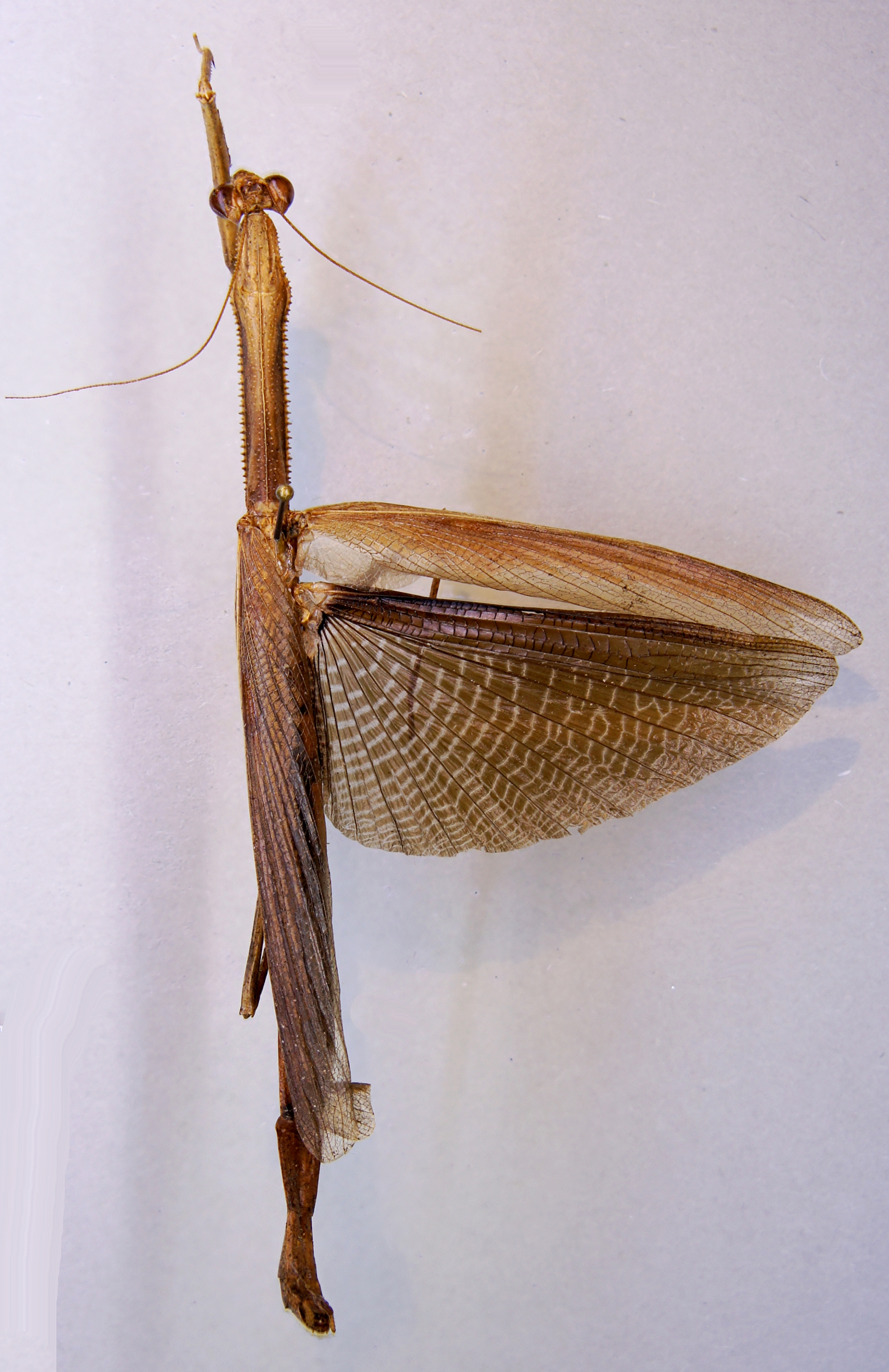
- Male Danuria buchholzi

Scientific classification
- Kingdom: Animalia
- Phylum: Arthropoda
- Clade: Pancrustacea
- Class: Insecta
- Order: Mantodea
- Family: Deroplatyidae
- Subfamily: Popinae
- Tribe: Popini
- Genus: Danuria; Stål, 1856

Species
- 14 species (see text)

Synonyms
- Danuriodes Giglio-Tos, 1907; Daniura Saussure, 1869

= Danuria =

Genus of praying mantises

Danuria is a genus of African praying mantids in the family Deroplatyidae.

Males are mesopterous and measure 50–90 mm (2.0–3.5 in) in length. Females are micropterous and measure 61–100 mm (2.4–3.9 in) in length.

== Species ==
There are 14 recognized species in two subgenera:

Subgenus Danuria (Danuria) Stål, 1856

- Danuria angusticollis Beier, 1931
- Danuria buchholzi Gerstaecker, 1883
- Danuria contorta Sjöstedt, 1912
- Danuria fusca Giglio-Tos, 1914
- Danuria gracilis Schulthess-Schindler, 1899
- Danuria impannosa Karsch, 1889
- Danuria obscuripennis Chopard, 1914
- Danuria sublineata Werner, 1929
- Danuria thunbergi Stål, 1856

Subgenus Danuria (Danuriodes) Giglio-Tos, 1907

- Danuria affinis Giglio-Tos, 1914
- Danuria barbozae Bolivar, 1889
- Danuria congica Giglio-Tos, 1917
- Danuria kilimandjarica Sjöstedt, 1909
- Danuria serratodentata Karsch, 1889

== See also ==
- List of mantis genera and species
