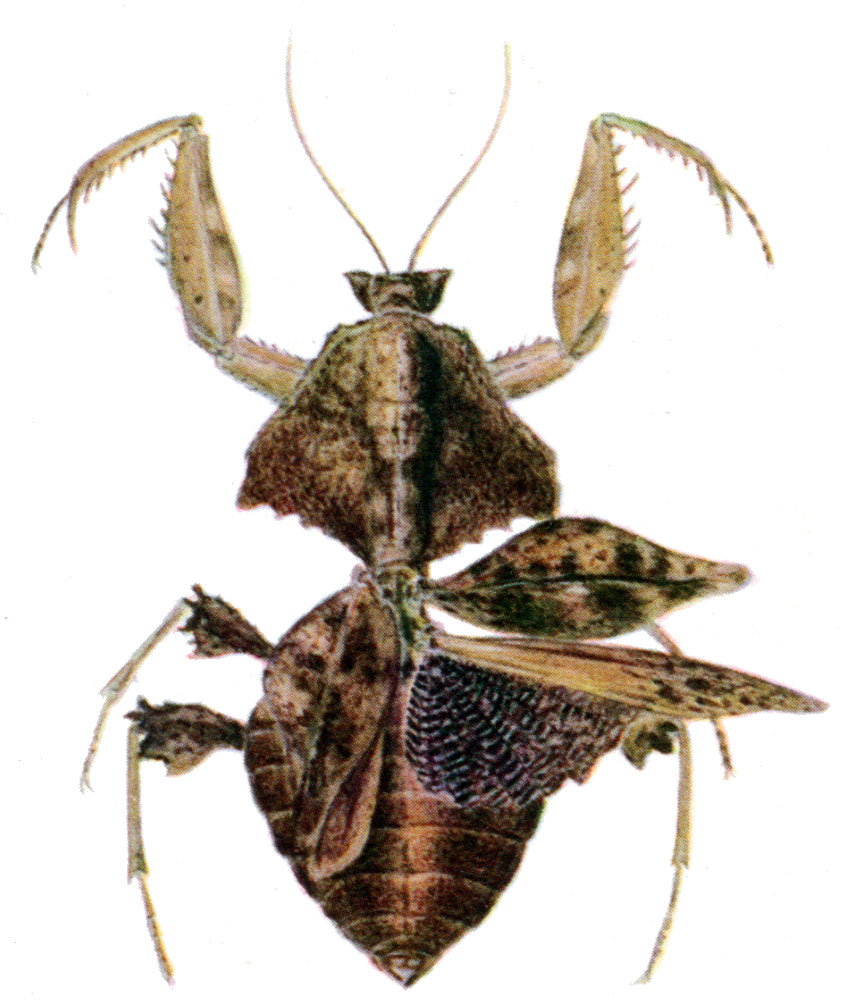
- Adult female Brancsikia freyi

Scientific classification
- Kingdom: Animalia
- Phylum: Arthropoda
- Clade: Pancrustacea
- Class: Insecta
- Superorder: Dictyoptera
- Order: Mantodea
- Family: Majangidae; Giglio-Tos. 1915

= Majangidae =

Family of praying mantises

The Majangidae are a revived (2019) family of praying mantids from Madagascar.

As part of a major revision of mantid taxonomy, this family consists of genera in two subfamilies previously placed in the Liturgusidae (Majanginae) and Deroplatyinae. The new placement means that this taxon is part of the superfamily Epaphroditoidea (of the clade Cernomantodea) and infraorder Schizomantodea.

== Subfamilies and genera ==
The Mantodea Species File lists two subfamilies:

Brancsikiinae

- Brancsikia Saussure & Zehntner, 1895: 2 spp.

Majanginae

- tribe Danuriellini
  - Danuriella Westwood, 1889: 3 spp.
- tribe Majangini
  - Liturgusella Giglio-Tos, 1915
    - monotypic L. malagassa Saussure & Zehntner, 1895
  - Majanga Wood-Mason, 1891: 3 spp.
    - Majanga basilaris Westwood, 1889 - type species
