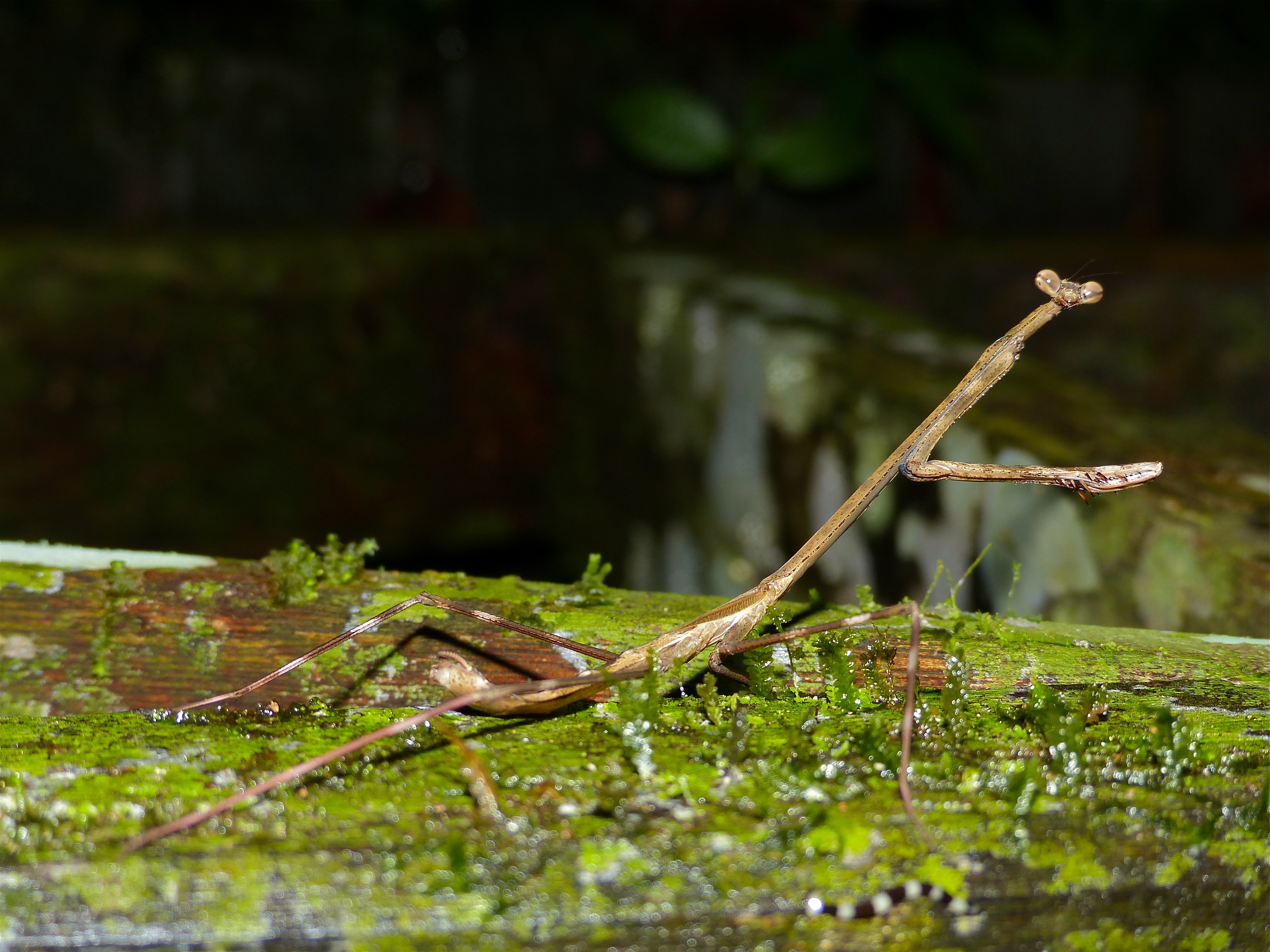
- Euchomenella heteroptera female

Scientific classification
- Kingdom: Animalia
- Phylum: Arthropoda
- Clade: Pancrustacea
- Class: Insecta
- Order: Mantodea
- Family: Deroplatyidae
- Tribe: Euchomenellini
- Genus: Euchomenella; Giglio-Tos, 1916

= Euchomenella =

Genus of praying mantises

Euchomenella is a genus of mantids and typical of the tribe Euchomenellini. Current records are from Vietnam and Borneo.

== Species ==
The Mantodea Species File currently lists:

- Euchomenella adwinae Vermeersch, 2018
- Euchomenella apicalis Werner, 1922
- Euchomenella heteroptera de Haan, 1842 (type species)
- Euchomenella macrops Saussure, 1870
- Euchomenella matilei Roy, 2001
- Euchomenella moluccarum Saussure, 1872
- Euchomenella thoracica de Haan, 1842
- Euchomenella udovichenkoi Shcherbakov, 2012
