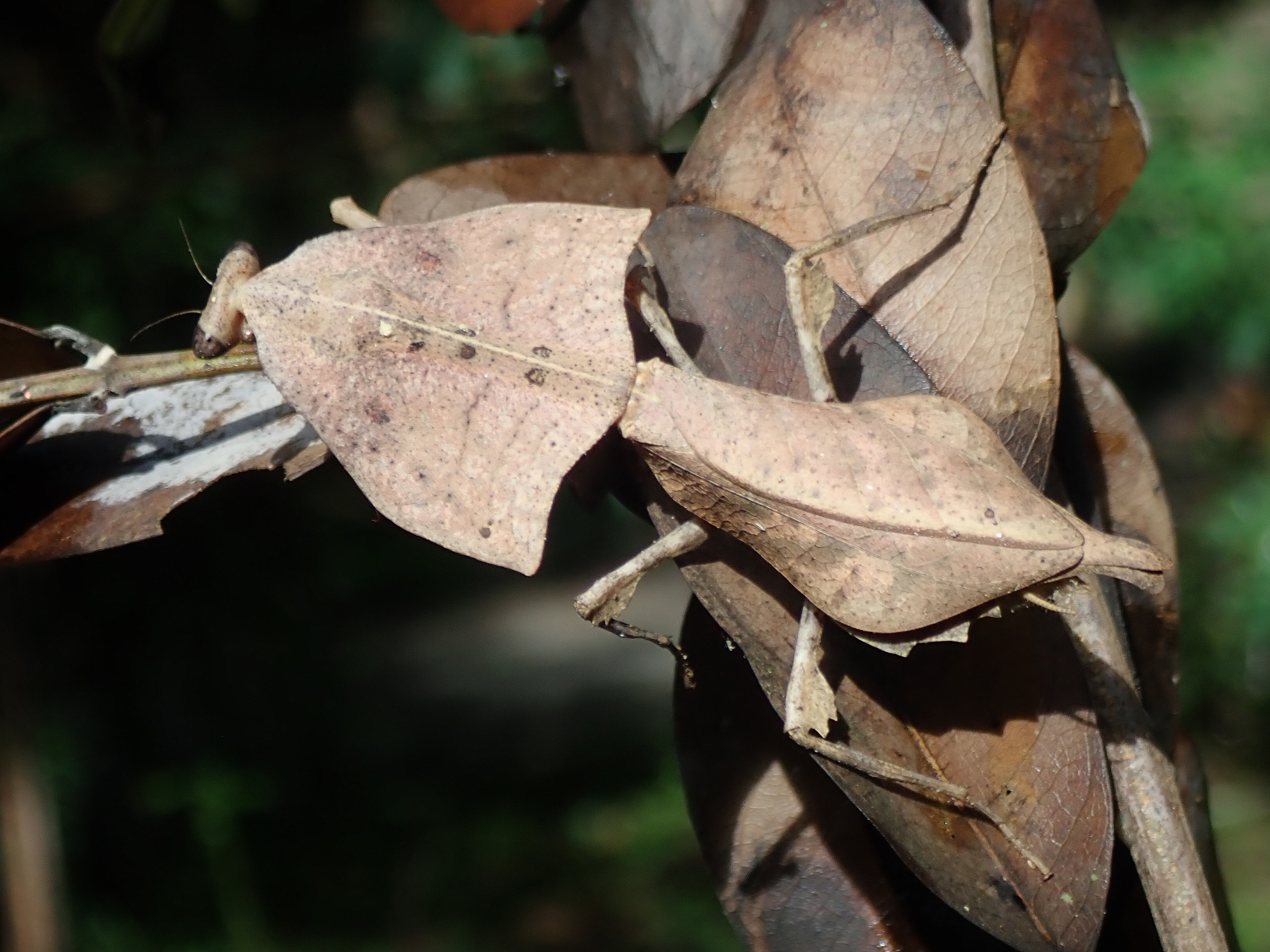
- Deroplatys gorochovi, Vietnam

Scientific classification
- Kingdom: Animalia
- Phylum: Arthropoda
- Clade: Pancrustacea
- Class: Insecta
- Order: Mantodea
- Clade: Mantidea
- Superfamily: Mantoidea
- Family: Deroplatyidae; Westwood, 1889

= Deroplatyidae =

Family of praying mantises

The Deroplatyidae are a family of praying mantises, based on the type genus Deroplatys. As part of a major revision of mantis taxonomy, the subfamily Deroplatyinae has been moved here from the previously structured family Mantidae.

The new placement is in superfamily Mantoidea (of group Cernomantodea) and infraorder Schizomantodea. Genera in this family have been recorded from: Africa, India, Indochina and Malesia.

== Subfamilies, tribes and genera ==
The Mantodea Species File lists two subfamilies:

=== Subfamily Deroplatyinae ===
- tribe Deroplatyini (Asia)
  - Deroplatys Westwood, 1839
  - Mythomantis Giglio-Tos, 1916
  - Pseudempusa Brunner v. W., 1893
- tribe Euchomenellini (Asia)
  - Euchomenella Giglio-Tos, 1916
  - Indomenella Roy, 2008
  - Phasmomantella Vermeersch, 2018
  - Tagalomantis Hebard, 1920

=== Subfamily Popinae ===
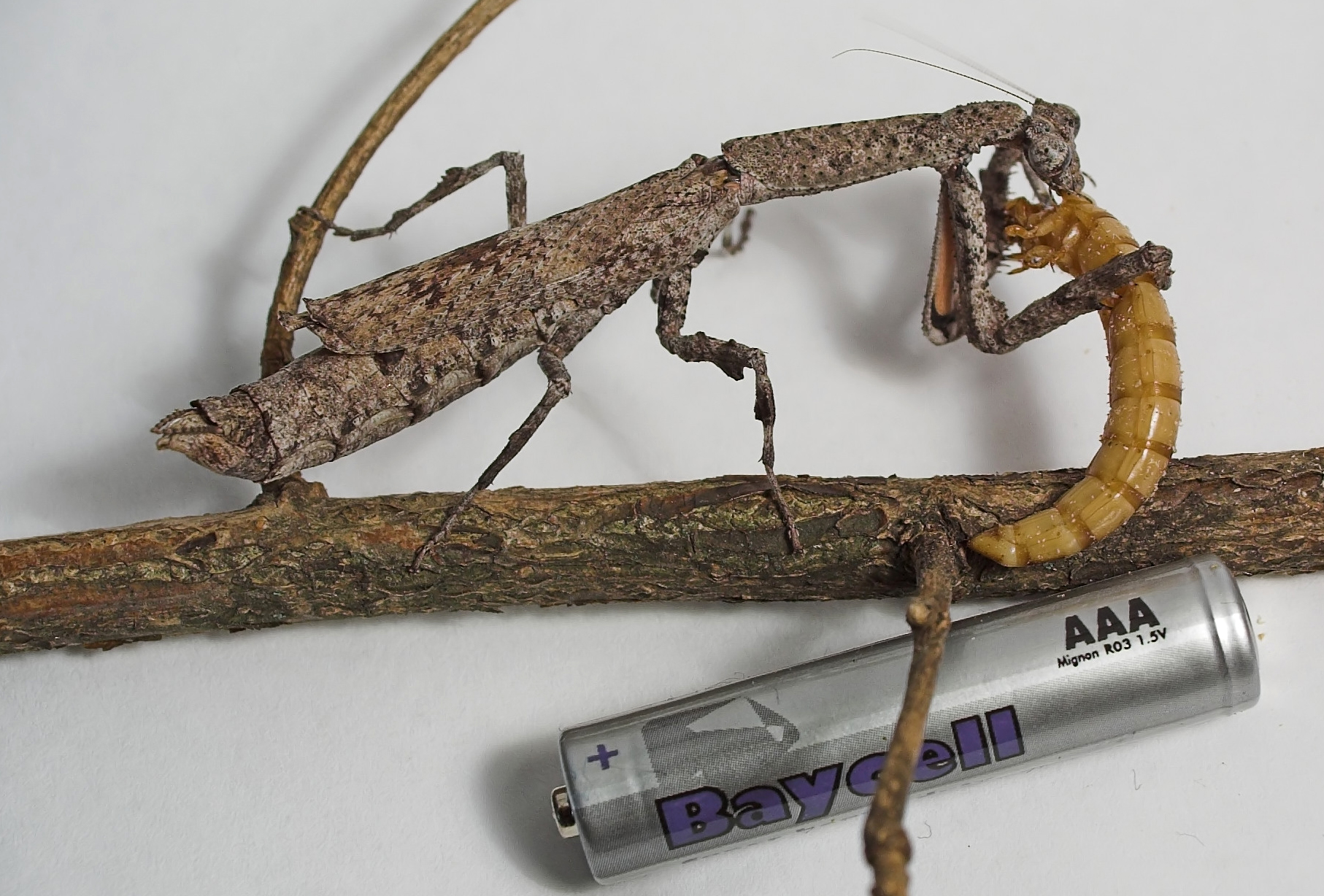
Popa spurca adult

- tribe Leptocolini (Africa)
  - subtribe Euchomenina
    - Euchomena Saussure, 1870
  - subtribe Leptocolina
    - Afrothespis Roy, 2006
    - Agrionopsis Werner, 1908
    - Leptocola Gerstaecker, 1883
    - Stenopyga Karsch, 1892
- tribe Popini (Africa)
  - Danuria Stal, 1856
  - †Lithophotina Sharov, 1962
  - Macrodanuria Sjostedt, 1900
  - Macropopa Giglio-Tos, 1914
  - Neodanuria La Greca & Lombardo, 1986
  - Popa Serville, 1839
