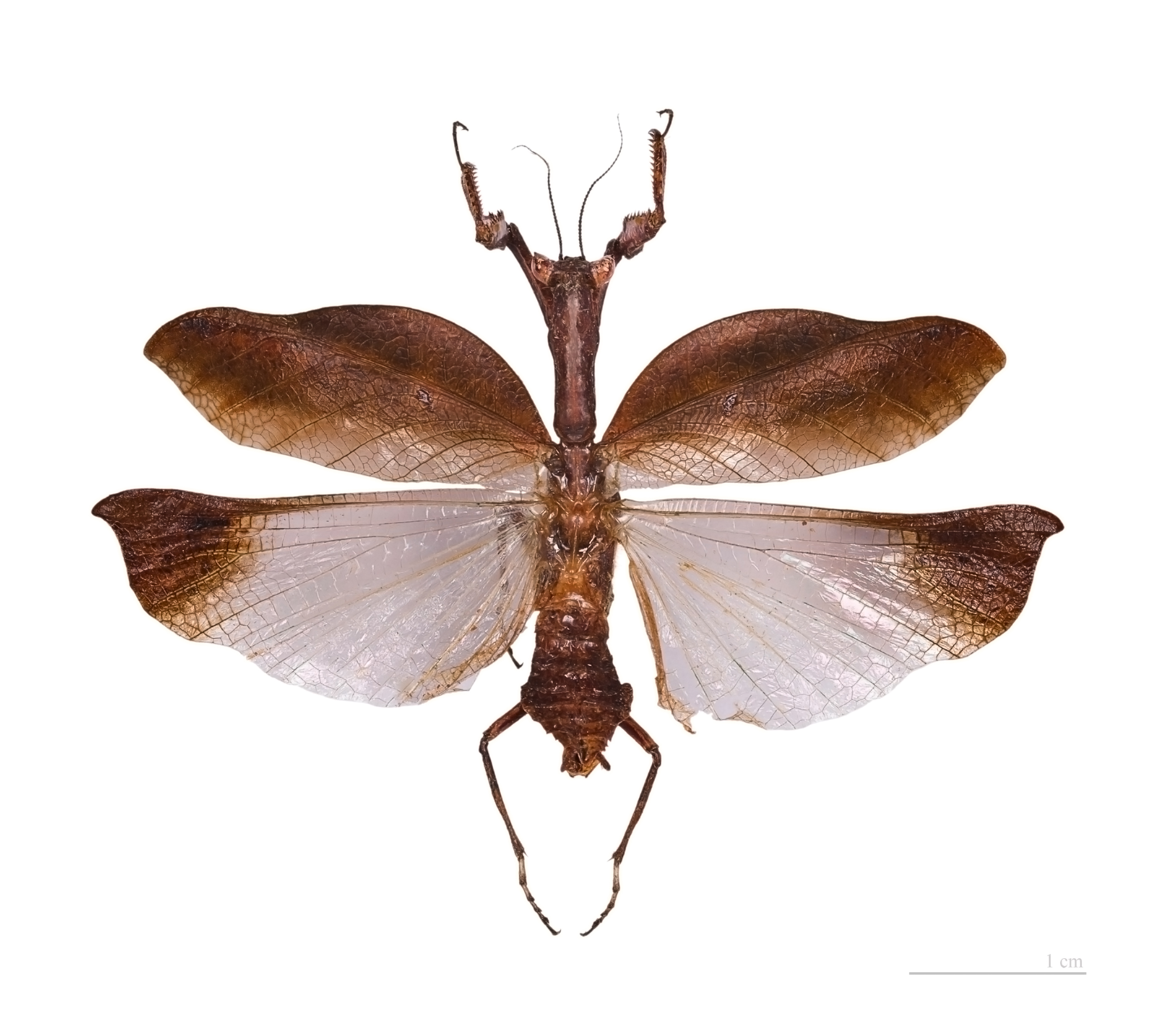
- Metilia amazonica

Scientific classification
- Kingdom: Animalia
- Phylum: Arthropoda
- Clade: Pancrustacea
- Class: Insecta
- Order: Mantodea
- Family: Acanthopidae
- Subfamily: Acanthopinae
- Tribe: Acanthopini

= Acanthopini =

Tribe of praying mantises

Acanthopini (from Ancient Greek ἄκανθα (ákantha), meaning "spine", and ὅψ (óps), meaning "eye") is a tribe of mantises in the family Acanthopidae. Ii is the only tribe in the subfamily Acanthopinae and contains eight genera and 37 species.

== Genera ==
The following genera are recognised in the tribe Acanthopini:

- Acanthops (Serville, 1831)
- Decimiana (Uvarov, 1940)
- Lagrecacanthops Roy, 2004
- Metacanthops Agudelo, Maldaner & Rafael, 2019
- Metilia (Stal, 1877)
- Miracanthops Roy, 2004
- Plesiacanthops Chopard, 1913
- Pseudacanthops (Saussure, 1870)

== See also ==
- List of mantis genera and species
