= A. fuscorufescens =

A. fuscorufescens may refer to:

- Abacetus fuscorufescens, a ground beetle
- Automolis fuscorufescens, a synonym of Automolis subulva, a moth found in Africa
