= Decimia =

Decimia may refer to:

- Decimia, a synonym for a genus of mantises, Decimiana
- Decimia, a synonym for a genus of moths, Automolis
- Decimia gens, ancient Roman clan
