= Acontista championi =

Scientific classification
- Domain: Eukaryota
- Kingdom: Animalia
- Phylum: Arthropoda
- Class: Insecta
- Order: Mantodea
- Family: Acanthopidae
- Genus: Acontista
- Species: A. championi

Binomial name
- Acontista championi Kirby, 1904

Synonyms
- Acontista quadrimaculata Saussure & Zehntner, 1894

Species of praying mantis

Acontista championi is a species of mantid in the family Acontistidae.
