= Acontista maroniensis =

Scientific classification
- Domain: Eukaryota
- Kingdom: Animalia
- Phylum: Arthropoda
- Class: Insecta
- Order: Mantodea
- Family: Acanthopidae
- Genus: Acontista
- Species: A. maroniensis

Binomial name
- Acontista maroniensis Chopard, 1911

Species of praying mantis

Acontista maroniensis is a species of mantid in the family Acontistidae.
