= Acontista vitrea =

Scientific classification
- Domain: Eukaryota
- Kingdom: Animalia
- Phylum: Arthropoda
- Class: Insecta
- Order: Mantodea
- Family: Acanthopidae
- Genus: Acontista
- Species: A. vitrea

Binomial name
- Acontista vitrea Saussure & Zehntner, 1894

Species of praying mantis

Acontista vitrea is a species of mantis in the family Acontistidae. It was first collected from the Volcán de Chiriquí in Panama.
