= Acontista piracicabensis =

Scientific classification
- Domain: Eukaryota
- Kingdom: Animalia
- Phylum: Arthropoda
- Class: Insecta
- Order: Mantodea
- Family: Acanthopidae
- Genus: Acontista
- Species: A. piracicabensis

Binomial name
- Acontista piracicabensis Toledo Piza, 1967

Species of praying mantis

Acontista piracicabensis is a species of mantid in the family Acontistidae.
