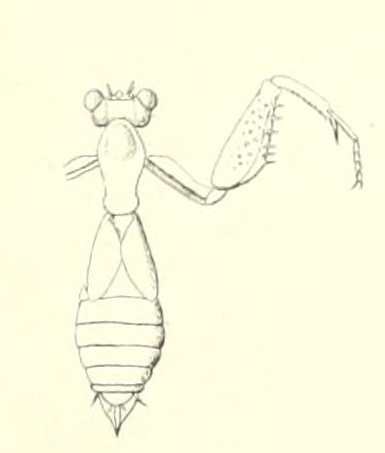
- female

Scientific classification
- Domain: Eukaryota
- Kingdom: Animalia
- Phylum: Arthropoda
- Class: Insecta
- Order: Mantodea
- Family: Acanthopidae
- Genus: Acontista
- Species: A. brevipennis

Binomial name
- Acontista brevipennis Saussure, 1872

= Acontista brevipennis =

Species of praying mantis

Acontista brevipennis is a species of mantid in the family Acontistidae.
