= Acontista chopardi =

Scientific classification
- Kingdom: Animalia
- Phylum: Arthropoda
- Class: Insecta
- Order: Mantodea
- Family: Acanthopidae
- Genus: Acontista
- Species: A. chopardi

Binomial name
- Acontista chopardi Giglio-Tos, 1927

Species of praying mantis

Acontista chopardi is a species of mantid in the family Acontistidae.
