= Acontista minima =

Scientific classification
- Kingdom: Animalia
- Phylum: Arthropoda
- Class: Insecta
- Order: Mantodea
- Family: Acanthopidae
- Genus: Acontista
- Species: A. minima

Binomial name
- Acontista minima Giglio-Tos, 1915

Species of praying mantis

Acontista minima is a species of mantid in the family Acontistidae.
