= Acontista mexicana =

Scientific classification
- Kingdom: Animalia
- Phylum: Arthropoda
- Clade: Pancrustacea
- Class: Insecta
- Order: Mantodea
- Family: Acanthopidae
- Genus: Acontista
- Species: A. mexicana

Binomial name
- Acontista mexicana Saussure & Zehntner, 1871

Species of praying mantis

Acontista mexicana, the Mexican acanthops, is a species of mantis in the family Acontistidae.
