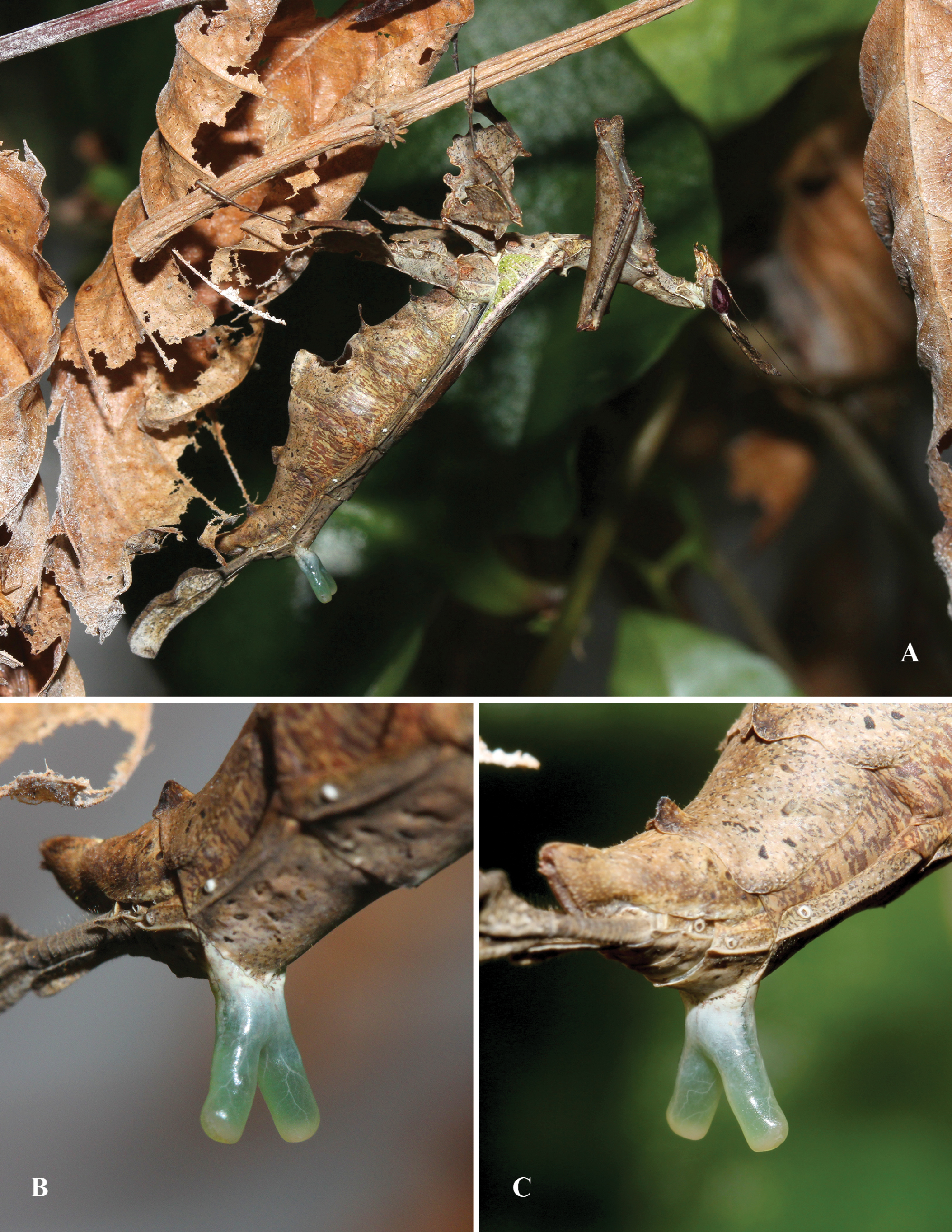
- A. Lateral view of calling female; B. Pheromone gland in anterolateral view; C. Pheromone gland in posterolateral view

Scientific classification
- Kingdom: Animalia
- Phylum: Arthropoda
- Clade: Pancrustacea
- Class: Insecta
- Order: Mantodea
- Family: Acanthopidae
- Genus: Stenophylla
- Species: S. lobivertex

Binomial name
- Stenophylla lobivertex Lombardo, 2000

= Stenophylla lobivertex =

Species of mantis

Stenophylla lobivertex, also called the dragon mantis (not to be confused with those from the genus Toxodera), is a species of mantis found in South America. Females possess an inflatable green pheromone gland near the end of their abdomen, presumably for attracting males.

== Description ==
It is a leaf mimicking species, growing up to 4,5 - 5 cm in length with a prominent vertex process and 8 - 9 posteroventral spines on the forefemur. It inhabits the tropical rainforests of Ecuador and Peru.

== Pheromone gland ==
This species has a protrusible, bifurcated (Y-shaped) gland of 6 mm length and 1 mm width located between the sixth and seventh tergite. It is protracted by sexually receptive females during nighttime while undisturbed. The protraction occurs over the course of a few minutes by filling with haemolymph, but once disturbed it retracts instantly. While other mantodeans do possess pheromone glands, some of which can bulge out slightly, S. lobivertex is the only species known to possess one of such structure.

== See also ==
- List of mantis genera and species
- Stenophylla cornigera
