= Acontista fraterna =

Scientific classification
- Domain: Eukaryota
- Kingdom: Animalia
- Phylum: Arthropoda
- Class: Insecta
- Order: Mantodea
- Family: Acanthopidae
- Genus: Acontista
- Species: A. fraterna

Binomial name
- Acontista fraterna Saussure & Zehntner, 1894

Synonyms
- Acontista violacea Beier, 1935

Species of praying mantis

Acontista fraterna is a species of mantis in the family Acontistidae.
