= Acontista ecuadorica =

Scientific classification
- Kingdom: Animalia
- Phylum: Arthropoda
- Clade: Pancrustacea
- Class: Insecta
- Order: Mantodea
- Family: Acanthopidae
- Genus: Acontista
- Species: A. ecuadorica

Binomial name
- Acontista ecuadorica Hebard, 1924

Species of praying mantis

Acontista ecuadorica is a species of mantis in the family Acanthopidae.
