= Acontista multicolor =

Scientific classification
- Kingdom: Animalia
- Phylum: Arthropoda
- Clade: Pancrustacea
- Class: Insecta
- Order: Mantodea
- Family: Acanthopidae
- Genus: Acontista
- Species: A. multicolor

Binomial name
- Acontista multicolor Saussure, 1870

Species of praying mantis

Acontista multicolor, the multicolored acanthops, is a small species of South American mantis in the family Acanthopidae. It is known from Venezuela and Trinidad & Tobago. Its presence on Guadeloupe is uncertain as there are no recent records, despite intensive search. Indeed, its type locality was spelled "Guadalupe" and may refer to another place of that name.
