= Acontista amazonica =

Scientific classification
- Kingdom: Animalia
- Phylum: Arthropoda
- Clade: Pancrustacea
- Class: Insecta
- Order: Mantodea
- Family: Acanthopidae
- Genus: Acontista
- Species: A. amazonica

Binomial name
- Acontista amazonica Beier, 1929

Species of praying mantis

Acontista amazonica, the Amazonian acanthops, is a species of mantis in the family Acanthopidae.
