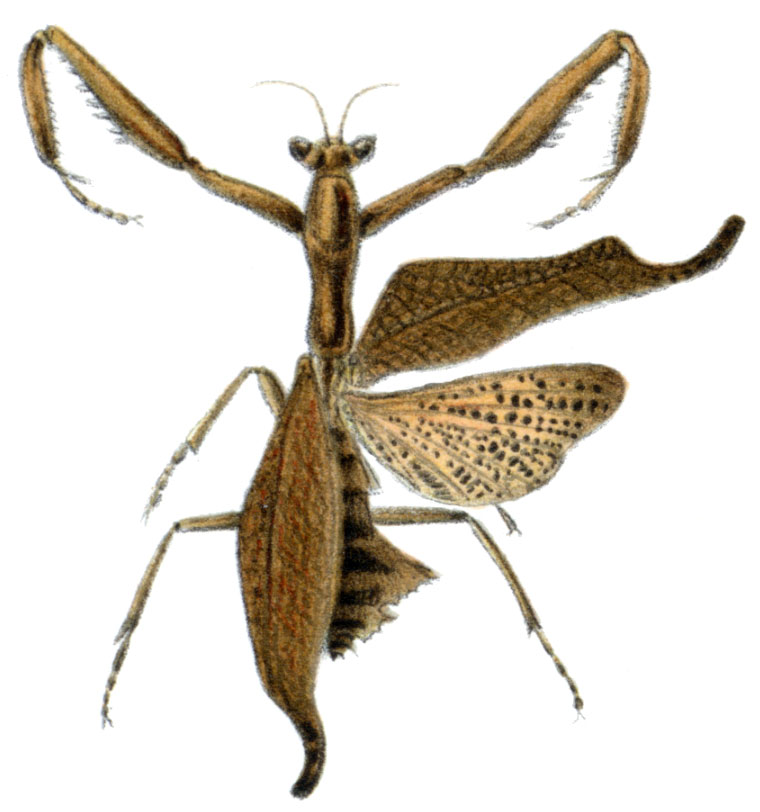

Scientific classification
- Domain: Eukaryota
- Kingdom: Animalia
- Phylum: Arthropoda
- Class: Insecta
- Order: Mantodea
- Family: Acanthopidae
- Genus: Decimiana
- Species: D. hebardi

Binomial name
- Decimiana hebardi Lombardo, 2000

= Decimiana hebardi =

Species of praying mantis

Decimiana hebardi is a species of praying mantis in the family Acanthopidae.

== See also ==
- List of mantis genera and species
