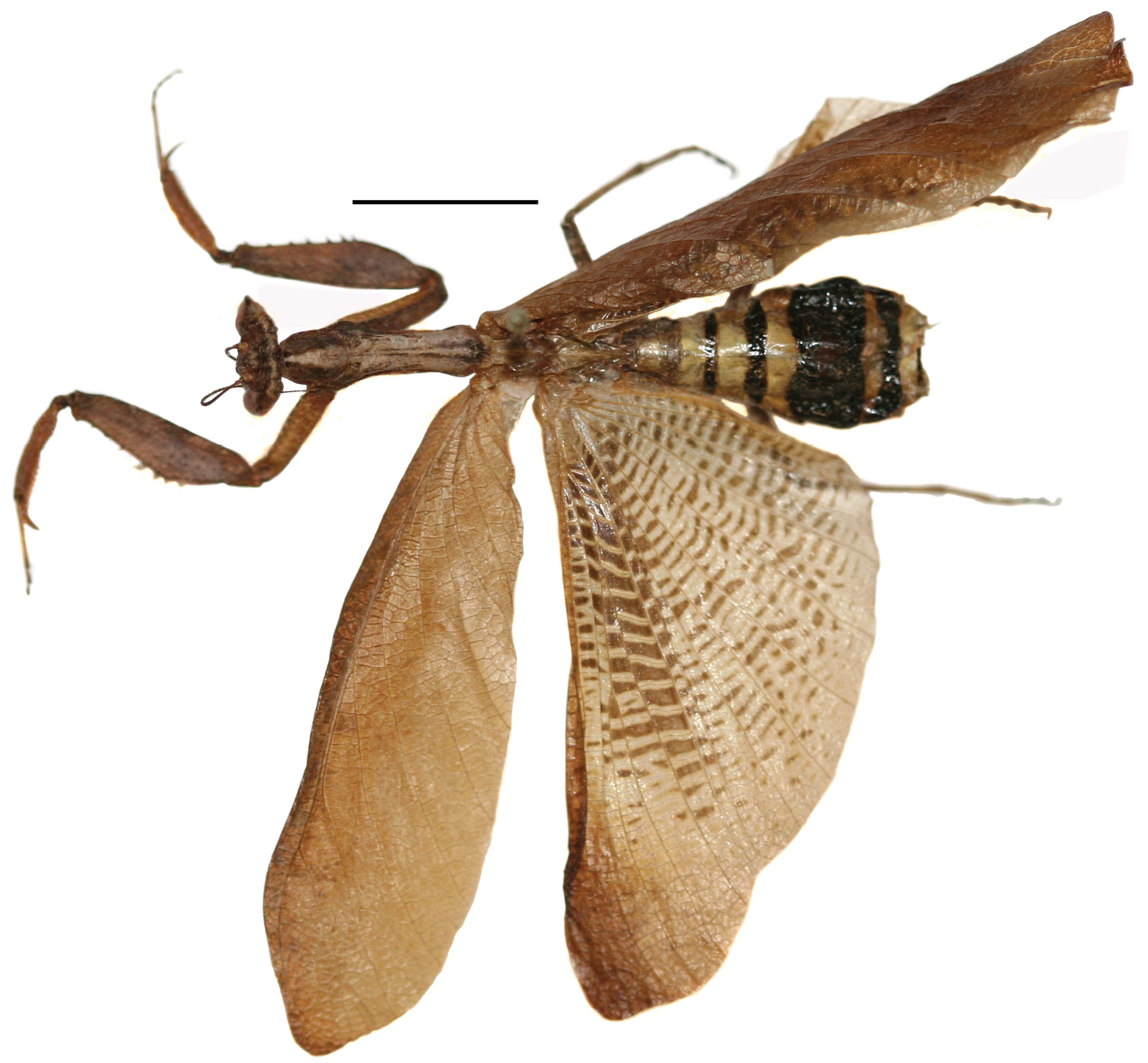
- Adult female Decimiana elliptica holotype

Scientific classification
- Kingdom: Animalia
- Phylum: Arthropoda
- Clade: Pancrustacea
- Class: Insecta
- Order: Mantodea
- Family: Acanthopidae
- Genus: Decimiana
- Species: D. elliptica

Binomial name
- Decimiana elliptica Menezes & Bravo, 2012

= Decimiana elliptica =

Species of praying mantis

Decimiana elliptica, the elliptic acanthops, is a species of praying mantis in the genus Decimiana in the order Mantodea. The type specimens were collected from the Chapanda Diamantina Mountain Range in Bahia, northeastern Brazil, near a mountain known as Morro do Pai Inácio.
