= Decimiana tessellata =

Scientific classification
- Domain: Eukaryota
- Kingdom: Animalia
- Phylum: Arthropoda
- Class: Insecta
- Order: Mantodea
- Family: Acanthopidae
- Genus: Decimiana
- Species: D. tessellata

Binomial name
- Decimiana tessellata (Charpentier, 1841)

Synonyms
- Acanthops tessellata Charpentier, 1841

Species of praying mantis

Decimiana tessellata is a species of praying mantis in the family Acanthopidae.

== See also ==
- List of mantis genera and species
