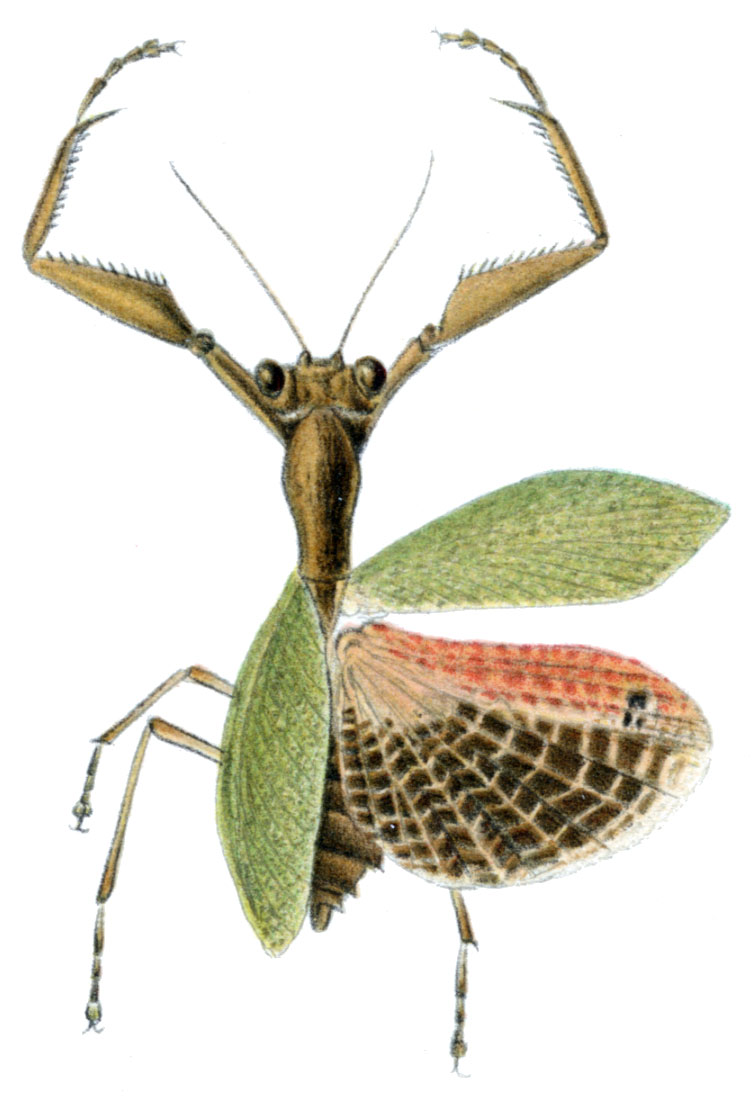

Scientific classification
- Kingdom: Animalia
- Phylum: Arthropoda
- Clade: Pancrustacea
- Class: Insecta
- Order: Mantodea
- Family: Acanthopidae
- Genus: Acontista
- Species: A. concinna

Binomial name
- Acontista concinna Perty, 1833

= Acontista concinna =

Species of praying mantis

Acontista concinna is a species of praying mantis in the family Acanthopidae that is native to Ecuador.

== See also ==
- List of mantis genera and species
