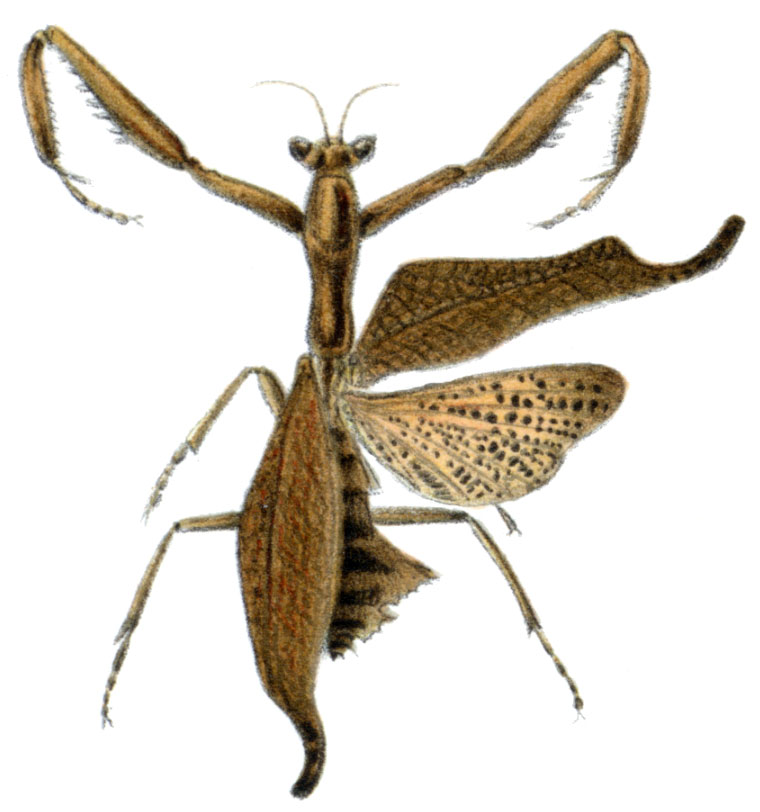

Scientific classification
- Domain: Eukaryota
- Kingdom: Animalia
- Phylum: Arthropoda
- Class: Insecta
- Order: Mantodea
- Family: Acanthopidae
- Genus: Decimiana
- Species: D. clavata

Binomial name
- Decimiana clavata Ippolito & Lombardo, 2004

= Decimiana clavata =

Species of praying mantis

Decimiana clavata is a species of praying mantis in the family Acanthopidae.

== See also ==
- List of mantis genera and species
