= Miracanthops eseejja =

Scientific classification
- Kingdom: Animalia
- Phylum: Arthropoda
- Clade: Pancrustacea
- Class: Insecta
- Order: Mantodea
- Family: Acanthopidae
- Genus: Miracanthops
- Species: M. eseejja

Binomial name
- Miracanthops eseejja Rivera, 2005

Species of praying mantis

Miracanthops eseejja is a species of praying mantis in the family Acanthopidae that is native to Peru. It was first described in 2005 by Peruvian entomologist Julio Rivera.
