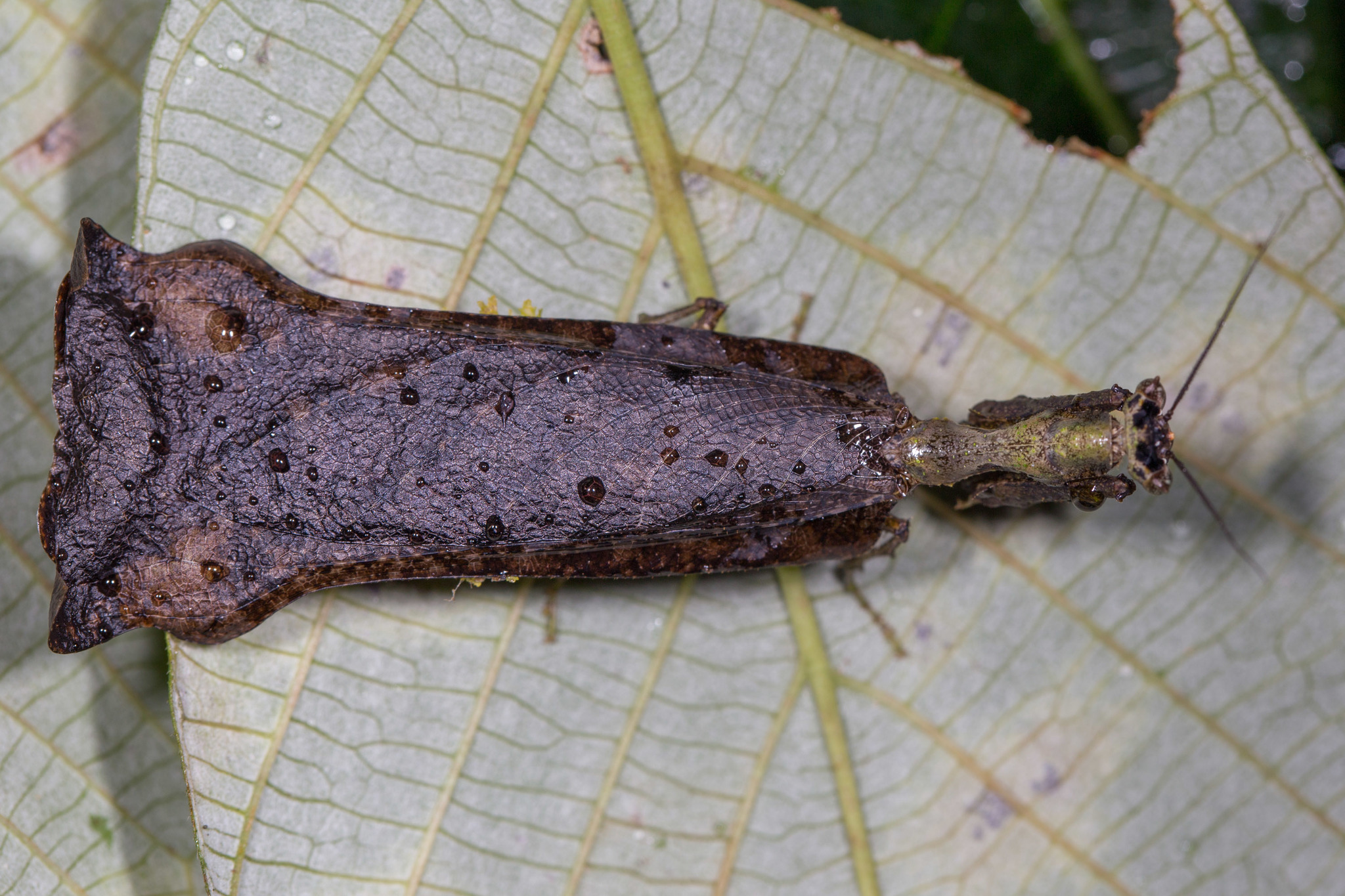

Scientific classification
- Kingdom: Animalia
- Phylum: Arthropoda
- Clade: Pancrustacea
- Class: Insecta
- Order: Mantodea
- Family: Acanthopidae
- Genus: Pseudacanthops
- Species: P. huaoranianus

Binomial name
- Pseudacanthops huaoranianus Lombardo, Ippolito & Rivera, 2013

= Pseudacanthops huaoranianus =

Species of mantis

Pseudacanthops huaoranianus is a species of mantis from South America.

== See also ==
- List of mantis genera and species
