= Metilia boliviana =

Scientific classification
- Kingdom: Animalia
- Phylum: Arthropoda
- Clade: Pancrustacea
- Class: Insecta
- Order: Mantodea
- Family: Acanthopidae
- Genus: Metilia
- Species: M. boliviana

Binomial name
- Metilia boliviana Werner, 1927

Species of mantis

Metilia boliviana is a species of mantis of the family Acanthopidae.
