= Decimiana bolivari =

Scientific classification
- Kingdom: Animalia
- Phylum: Arthropoda
- Clade: Pancrustacea
- Class: Insecta
- Order: Mantodea
- Family: Acanthopidae
- Genus: Decimiana
- Species: D. bolivari

Binomial name
- Decimiana bolivari (Chopard, 1916)

Synonyms
- Acanthops bolivari Chopard, 1916

Species of praying mantis

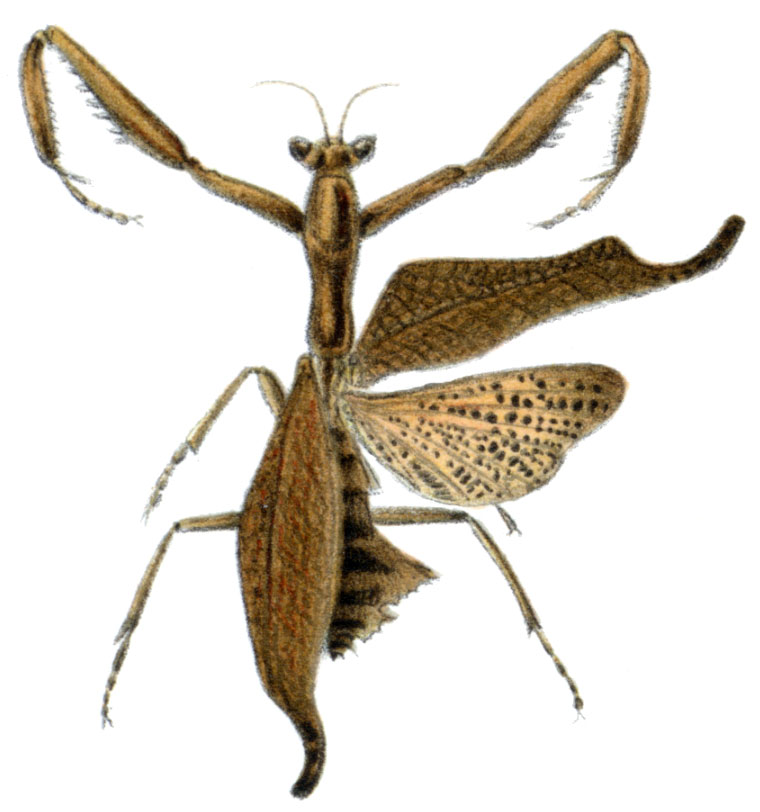
Image of insect

Decimiana bolivari, Bolivar's acanthops, is a species of praying mantis in the family Acanthopidae. It is native to South America.

== See also ==
- List of mantis genera and species
