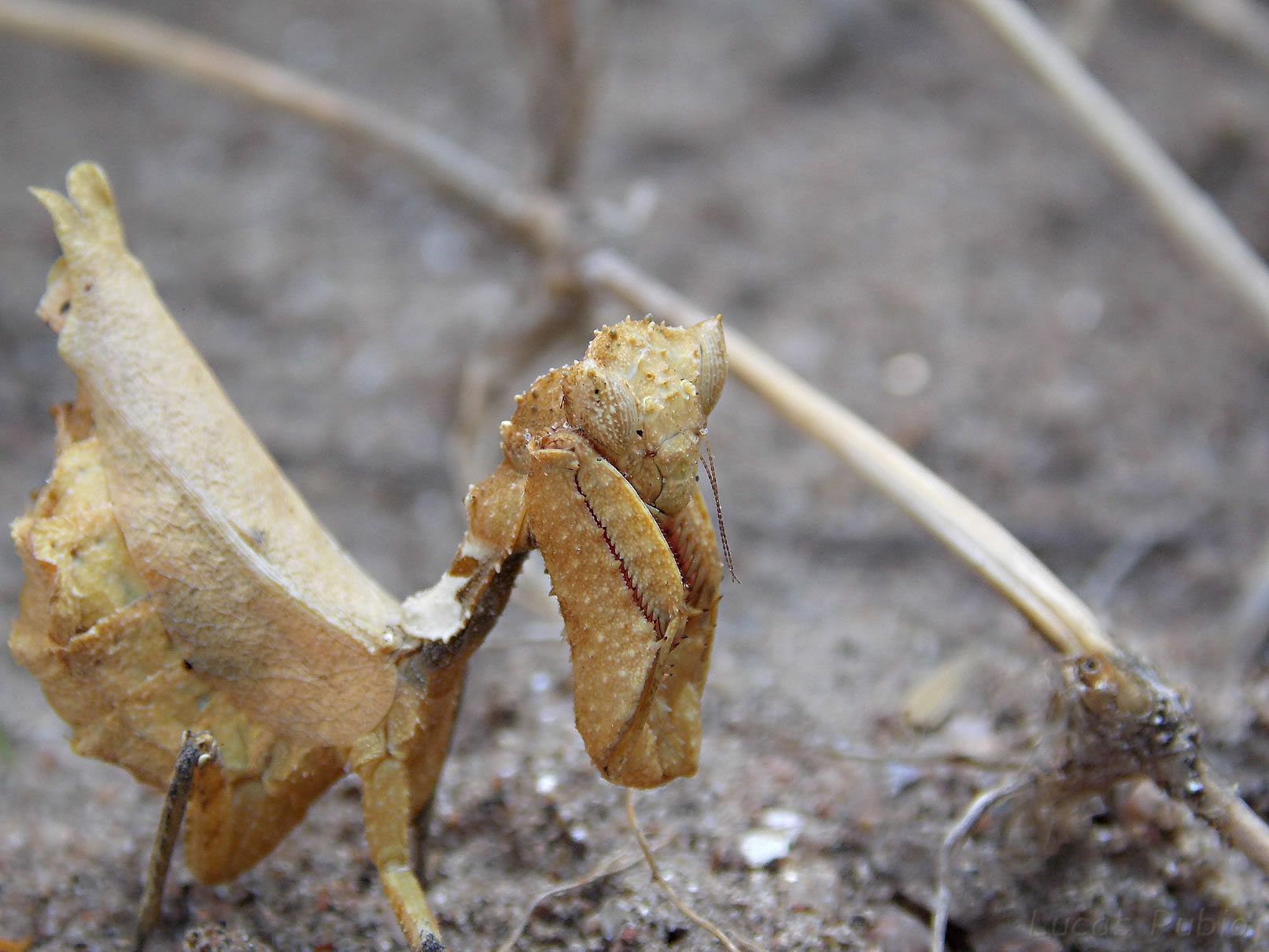

Scientific classification
- Kingdom: Animalia
- Phylum: Arthropoda
- Clade: Pancrustacea
- Class: Insecta
- Order: Mantodea
- Family: Acanthopidae
- Genus: Decimiana
- Species: D. rehni

Binomial name
- Decimiana rehni (Chopard, 1913)

Synonyms
- Plesiacanthops rehni Chopard, 1913

= Decimiana rehni =

Species of praying mantis

Decimiana rehni is a species of praying mantis in the family Acanthopidae.

== See also ==
- List of mantis genera and species
