= Azatrephes =

Scientific classification
- Kingdom: Animalia
- Phylum: Arthropoda
- Class: Insecta
- Order: Lepidoptera
- Superfamily: Noctuoidea
- Family: Erebidae
- Subfamily: Arctiinae
- Subtribe: Phaegopterina
- Genus: Azatrephes; Hampson, 1905

Type species
- Azatrephes discalis Walker, 1856

Genus of moths

Azatrephes is a genus of moths in the family Erebidae erected by George Hampson in 1905.

== Species ==
- Azatrephes discalis Walker, 1856
- Azatrephes fuliginosa (Rothschild, 1910)
- Azatrephes orientalis Rothschild, 1922
- Azatrephes paradisea (Butler, 1877)
