= Azatrephes paradisea =

Scientific classification
- Domain: Eukaryota
- Kingdom: Animalia
- Phylum: Arthropoda
- Class: Insecta
- Order: Lepidoptera
- Superfamily: Noctuoidea
- Family: Erebidae
- Subfamily: Arctiinae
- Genus: Azatrephes
- Species: A. paradisea

Binomial name
- Azatrephes paradisea (Butler, 1877)

Synonyms
- Zatrephes paradisea Butler, 1877

Species of moth

Azatrephes paradisea is a moth of the subfamily Arctiinae first described by Arthur Gardiner Butler in 1877. It is found in Brazil and French Guiana.
