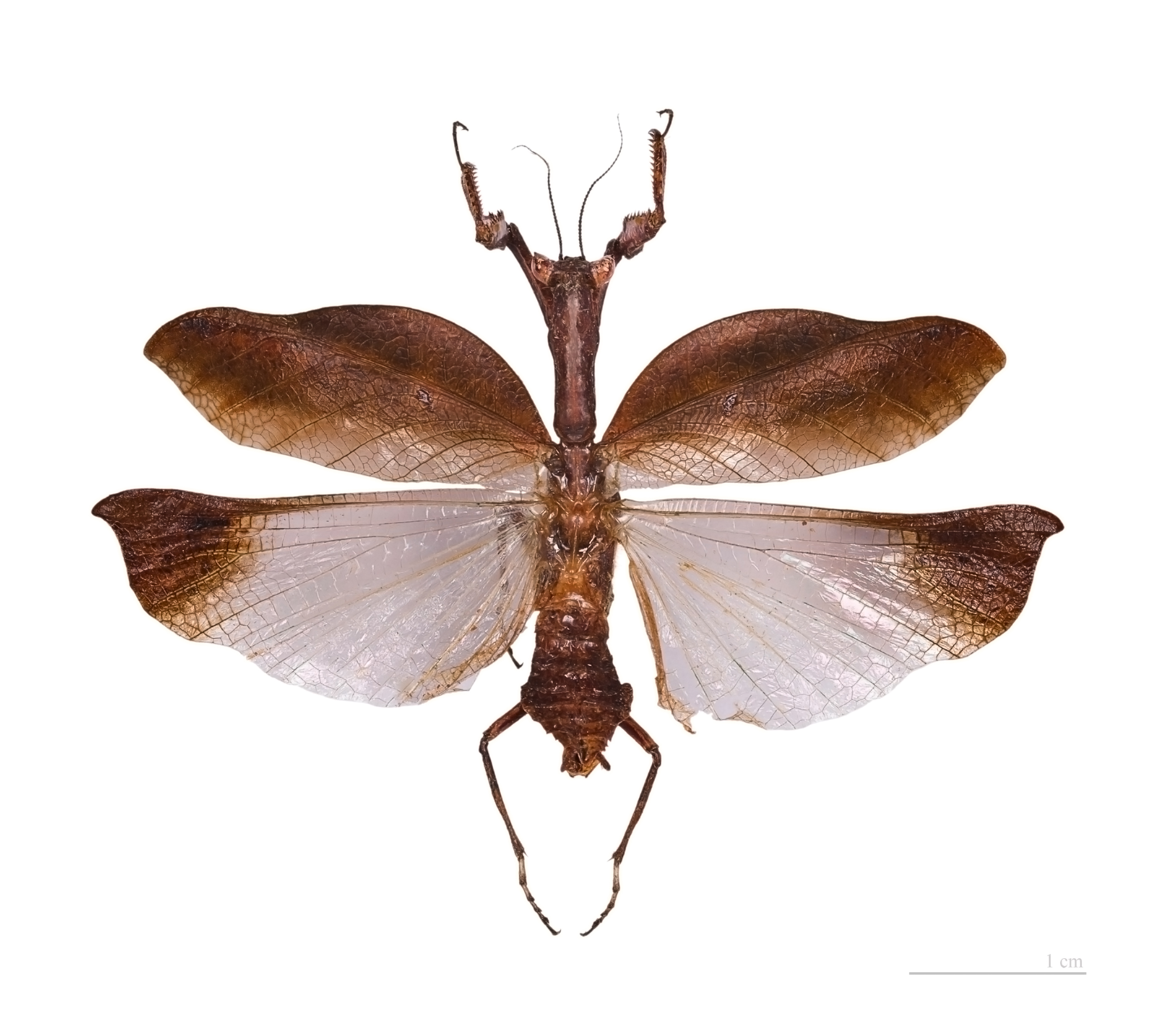
- Dead adult male Metilia amazonica - Muséum de Toulouse

Scientific classification
- Kingdom: Animalia
- Phylum: Arthropoda
- Clade: Pancrustacea
- Class: Insecta
- Order: Mantodea
- Family: Acanthopidae
- Genus: Metilia
- Species: M. amazonica

Binomial name
- Metilia amazonica Beier, 1930

Synonyms
- Acanthops amazonica

= Metilia amazonica =

Species of praying mantis

Metilia amazonica is a species of mantis of the family Acanthopidae that was historically Acanthops amazonica.

== Range ==
Brazil.
