= Azatrephes discalis =

Scientific classification
- Kingdom: Animalia
- Phylum: Arthropoda
- Class: Insecta
- Order: Lepidoptera
- Superfamily: Noctuoidea
- Family: Erebidae
- Subfamily: Arctiinae
- Genus: Azatrephes
- Species: A. discalis

Binomial name
- Azatrephes discalis (Walker, 1856)

Synonyms
- Halysidota discalis Walker, 1856

Species of moth

Azatrephes discalis is a moth of the subfamily Arctiinae first described by Francis Walker in 1856. It is found in French Guiana and Brazil.
