= Automolis crassa =

Scientific classification
- Kingdom: Animalia
- Phylum: Arthropoda
- Class: Insecta
- Order: Lepidoptera
- Superfamily: Noctuoidea
- Family: Erebidae
- Subfamily: Arctiinae
- Genus: Automolis
- Species: A. crassa

Binomial name
- Automolis crassa (Felder, 1874)

Synonyms
- Zagaris crassa Felder, 1874

Species of moth

Automolis crassa is a moth of the family Erebidae. It was described by Felder in 1874. It is found in Ethiopia and South Africa.
