= Miracanthops =

Scientific classification
- Kingdom: Animalia
- Phylum: Arthropoda
- Clade: Pancrustacea
- Class: Insecta
- Order: Mantodea
- Family: Acanthopidae
- Tribe: Acanthopini
- Genus: Miracanthops; Roy, 2004

Species
- M. eseejja; M. lombardi; M. poulaini

Genus of praying mantises

Miracanthops is a genus of mantises in the family Acanthopidae. All of the species in the genus are native to Peru and Ecuador.
