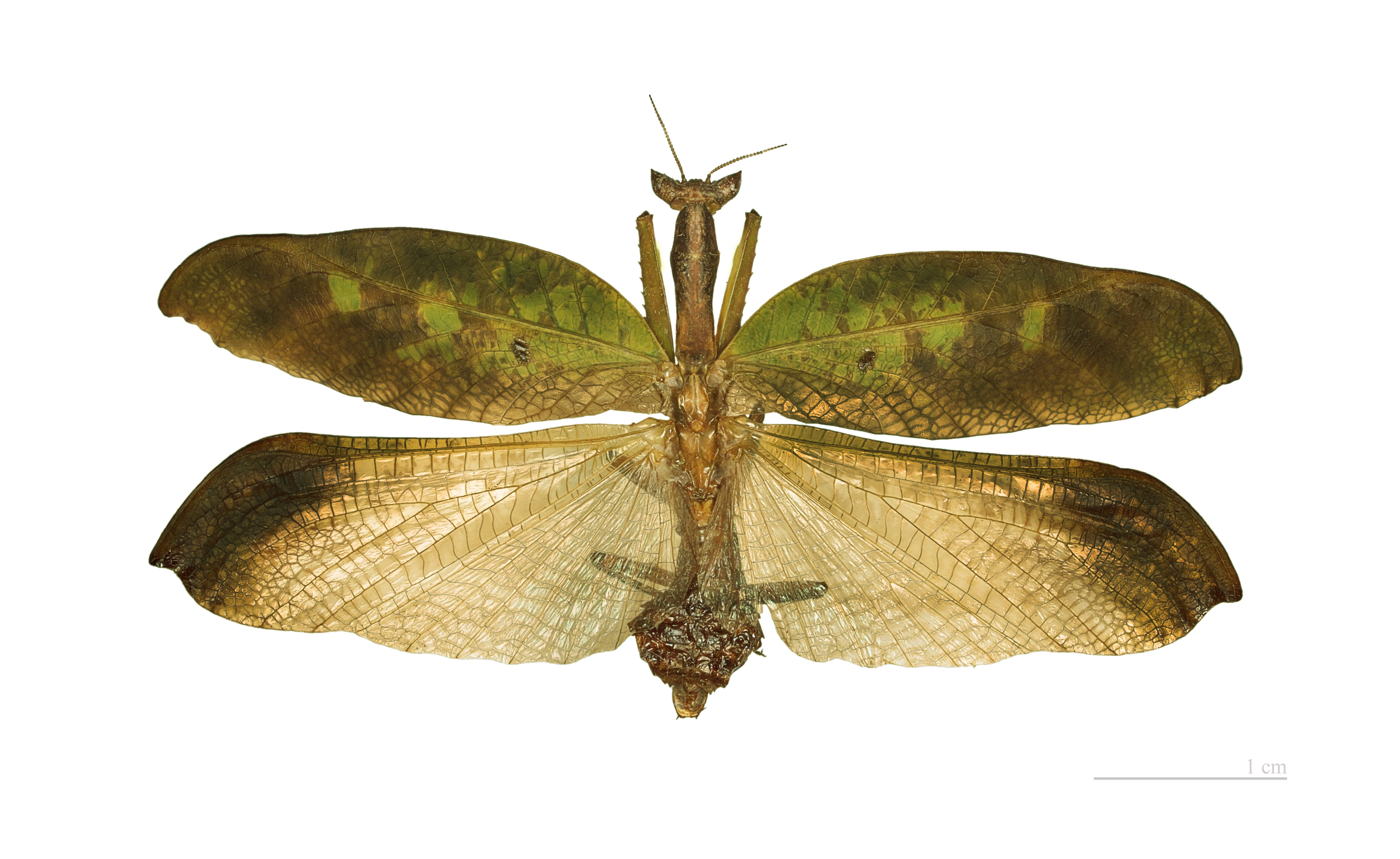
- Male Metilia brunnerii

Scientific classification
- Kingdom: Animalia
- Phylum: Arthropoda
- Clade: Pancrustacea
- Class: Insecta
- Order: Mantodea
- Family: Acanthopidae
- Genus: Metilia
- Species: M. brunnerii

Binomial name
- Metilia brunnerii (Saussure, 1871)

Synonyms
- Acanthops brunnerii Saussure, 1871; Metilia integra Stal, 1877; Acanthops adusta Gerstaecker, 1889

= Metilia brunnerii =

Species of praying mantis

Metilia brunnerii is a species of mantis of the family Acanthopidae.
