= Automolis pallida =

Scientific classification
- Kingdom: Animalia
- Phylum: Arthropoda
- Class: Insecta
- Order: Lepidoptera
- Superfamily: Noctuoidea
- Family: Erebidae
- Subfamily: Arctiinae
- Genus: Automolis
- Species: A. pallida

Binomial name
- Automolis pallida (Hampson, 1901)

Synonyms
- Metarctia pallida Hampson, 1901; Metarctia subrosea Kiriakoff, 1957

Species of moth

Automolis pallida is a moth of the family Erebidae. It was described by George Hampson in 1901. It is found in the Democratic Republic of the Congo, Eritrea, Ethiopia, Ghana, Kenya, Rwanda and South Africa.
