= Automolis incensa =

Scientific classification
- Kingdom: Animalia
- Phylum: Arthropoda
- Class: Insecta
- Order: Lepidoptera
- Superfamily: Noctuoidea
- Family: Erebidae
- Subfamily: Arctiinae
- Genus: Automolis
- Species: A. incensa

Binomial name
- Automolis incensa (Walker, 1864)

Synonyms
- Anace incensa Walker, 1864; Metarctia hewitti Janse, 1945

Species of moth

Automolis incensa is a moth of the family Erebidae. It was described by Francis Walker in 1864. It is found in South Africa.
