= Stenophylla cornigera =

Scientific classification
- Kingdom: Animalia
- Phylum: Arthropoda
- Clade: Pancrustacea
- Class: Insecta
- Order: Mantodea
- Family: Acanthopidae
- Genus: Stenophylla
- Species: S. cornigera

Binomial name
- Stenophylla cornigera Westwood, 1843

Species of praying mantis

Stenophylla cornigera is a species of praying mantis native to Brazil. It is commonly known as the Brazilian dragon mantis.

== See also ==
- Toxodera
