= Azatrephes orientalis =

Scientific classification
- Domain: Eukaryota
- Kingdom: Animalia
- Phylum: Arthropoda
- Class: Insecta
- Order: Lepidoptera
- Superfamily: Noctuoidea
- Family: Erebidae
- Subfamily: Arctiinae
- Genus: Azatrephes
- Species: A. orientalis

Binomial name
- Azatrephes orientalis Rothschild, 1922

Species of moth

Azatrephes orientalis is a moth of the subfamily Arctiinae. It is found in Brazil.
