= Automolis aurantiifusa =

Scientific classification
- Domain: Eukaryota
- Kingdom: Animalia
- Phylum: Arthropoda
- Class: Insecta
- Order: Lepidoptera
- Superfamily: Noctuoidea
- Family: Erebidae
- Subfamily: Arctiinae
- Genus: Automolis
- Species: A. aurantiifusa

Binomial name
- Automolis aurantiifusa (Rothschild, 1913)

Synonyms
- Melarctia aurantiifusa Rothschild, 1913

Species of moth

Automolis aurantiifusa is a moth of the family Erebidae. It was described by Rothschild in 1913. It is found in the Afrotropical realm.
