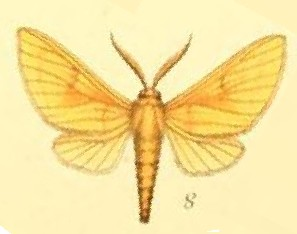
- Automolis subulva

Scientific classification
- Kingdom: Animalia
- Phylum: Arthropoda
- Clade: Pancrustacea
- Class: Insecta
- Order: Lepidoptera
- Superfamily: Noctuoidea
- Family: Erebidae
- Subfamily: Arctiinae
- Tribe: Syntomini
- Genus: Automolis; Hübner, [1819]

Synonyms
- Decimia Walker, 1856; Zagaris Walker, 1855

= Automolis =

Genus of moths

Automolis is a genus of moths in the family Erebidae erected by Jacob Hübner in 1819.

== Species ==
- Automolis aurantiifusa (Rothschild, 1913)
- Automolis bicolora (Walker, 1856)
- Automolis crassa (Felder, 1874)
- Automolis fuliginosa (Kiriakoff, 1953)
- Automolis incensa (Walker, 1864)
- Automolis meteus (Stoll, 1781)
- Automolis pallida (Hampson, 1901)
- Automolis subulva (Mabille, 1884)
