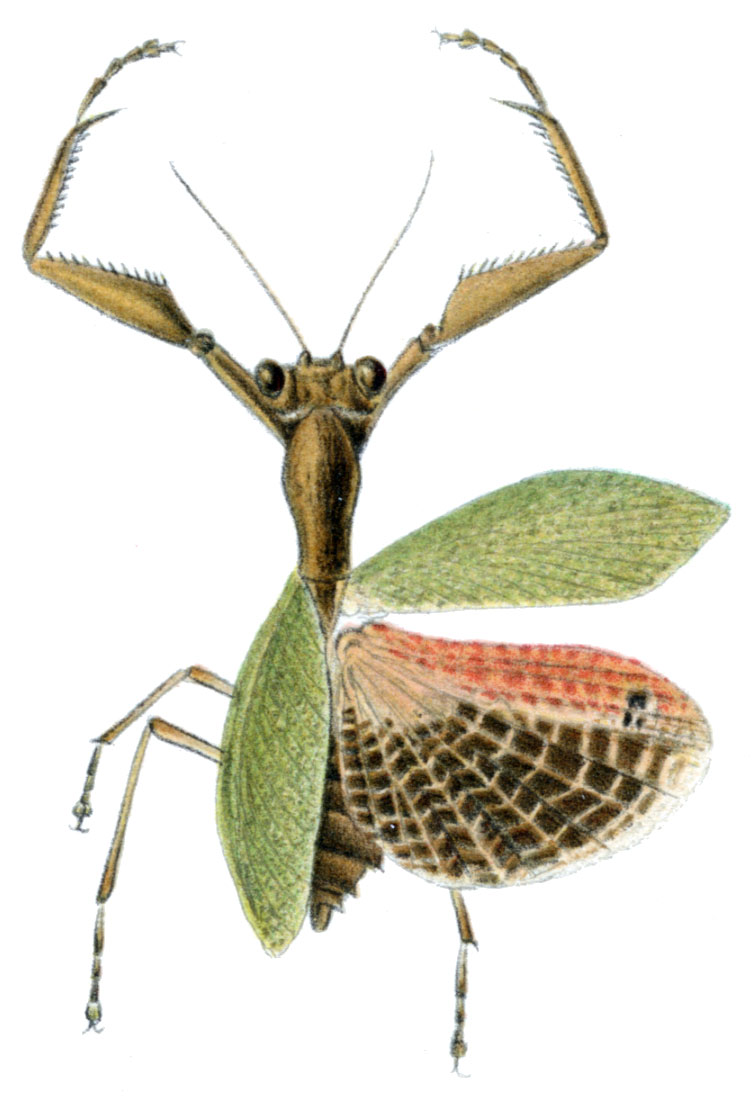
- Acontista concinna

Scientific classification
- Kingdom: Animalia
- Phylum: Arthropoda
- Clade: Pancrustacea
- Class: Insecta
- Order: Mantodea
- Family: Acanthopidae
- Tribe: Acontistini
- Genus: Acontista; Saussure, 1872

Species
- 28, see text.

Synonyms
- Acontiothespis Rehn, 1916; Acontistella Beier, 1929; Acontistes Burmeister, 1838; Metaphotina Toledo Piza, 1967

= Acontista =

Genus of praying mantises

Acontista is a genus of mantises in the family Acanthopidae.

== Species ==
- Acontista amazonica
- Acontista amoenula
- Acontista aurantiaca
- Acontista bolivari
- Acontista brevipennis
- Acontista cayennensis
- Acontista championi
- Acontista chopardi
- Acontista concinna
- Acontista cordillerae
- Acontista cubana
- Acontista ecuadorica
- Acontista eximia
- Acontista festae
- Acontista fraterna
- Acontista gracilis
- Acontista inquinata
- Acontista iriodes
- Acontista maroniensis
- Acontista mexicana
- Acontista minima
- Acontista multicolor
- Acontista parva
- Acontista piracicabensis
- Acontista rehni
- Acontista semirufa
- Acontista vitrea

== See also ==
- List of mantis genera and species
