= Automolis bicolora =

Scientific classification
- Kingdom: Animalia
- Phylum: Arthropoda
- Class: Insecta
- Order: Lepidoptera
- Superfamily: Noctuoidea
- Family: Erebidae
- Subfamily: Arctiinae
- Genus: Automolis
- Species: A. bicolora

Binomial name
- Automolis bicolora (Walker, 1856)

Synonyms
- Decimia bicolora Walker, 1856

Species of moth

Automolis bicolora is a moth of the family Erebidae. It was described by Francis Walker in 1856. It is found in Lesotho, South Africa and Zimbabwe.
