= Stenophylla =

- Stenophylla cornigera

Scientific classification
- Kingdom: Animalia
- Phylum: Arthropoda
- Clade: Pancrustacea
- Class: Insecta
- Order: Mantodea
- Family: Acanthopidae
- Tribe: Stenophyllini
- Genus: Stenophylla; Westwood, 1845

Genus of praying mantises

Stenophylla is a genus of praying mantis in the subfamily Stenophyllinae, which is now placed in the family Acanthopidae. It the sole genus of the tribe Stenophyllini.

Females of the species Stenophylla lobivertex have an inflatable green pheromone gland on their backs, presumably to attract male conspecifics. It is unknown whether such an organ is found on other species in the genus, or indeed in other members of Mantodea.

== Species ==
These three species belong to the genus Stenophylla:

- Stenophylla cornigera Westwood, 1843 —"Brazilian dragon mantis"
- Stenophylla gallardi Roy, 2005
- Stenophylla lobivertex Lombardo, 2000 —"dragon mantis"

== See also ==
- List of mantis genera and species
