= Azatrephes fuliginosa =

Scientific classification
- Domain: Eukaryota
- Kingdom: Animalia
- Phylum: Arthropoda
- Class: Insecta
- Order: Lepidoptera
- Superfamily: Noctuoidea
- Family: Erebidae
- Subfamily: Arctiinae
- Genus: Azatrephes
- Species: A. fuliginosa

Binomial name
- Azatrephes fuliginosa (Rothschild, 1910)

Synonyms
- Automolis fuliginosa Rothschild, 1910; Azatrephes fuliginosa ab. transiens Seitz, 1922; Azatrephes fuliginosa ab. infenestrata Seitz, 1922

Species of moth

Azatrephes fuliginosa is a moth of the family Erebidae first described by Walter Rothschild in 1910. It is found in Brazil.
