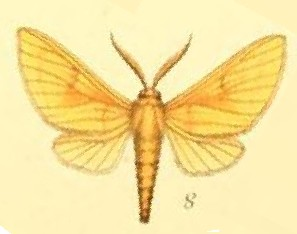

Scientific classification
- Domain: Eukaryota
- Kingdom: Animalia
- Phylum: Arthropoda
- Class: Insecta
- Order: Lepidoptera
- Superfamily: Noctuoidea
- Family: Erebidae
- Subfamily: Arctiinae
- Genus: Automolis
- Species: A. subulva

Binomial name
- Automolis subulva (Mabille, 1884)

Synonyms
- Bombix subulva Mabille, 1884; Balacra rubrovitta angolensis Kiriakoff, 1961; Metarctia paremphares var. fulvociliata Gaede, 1915; Metarctia invaria ab. pusillima Strand, 1912; Metarctia rubicundula ab. quadrisignatula Strand, 1912; Plegapteryx syntomia Plötz, 1880; Automolis congonis (Strand, 1917); Automolis fuscorufescens (Strand, 1917); Automolis hampsoni (Strand, 1917); Automolis lateritiola (Strand, 1917); Automolis opobensis (Strand, 1917); Automolis postrufescens (Strand, 1917); Automolis rosea (Aurivillius, 1905)

= Automolis subulva =

Species of moth

Automolis subulva is a species of moth of the family Erebidae. It was described by Paul Mabille in 1884. It is found in Cameroon, Equatorial Guinea, Ghana and Mali.
