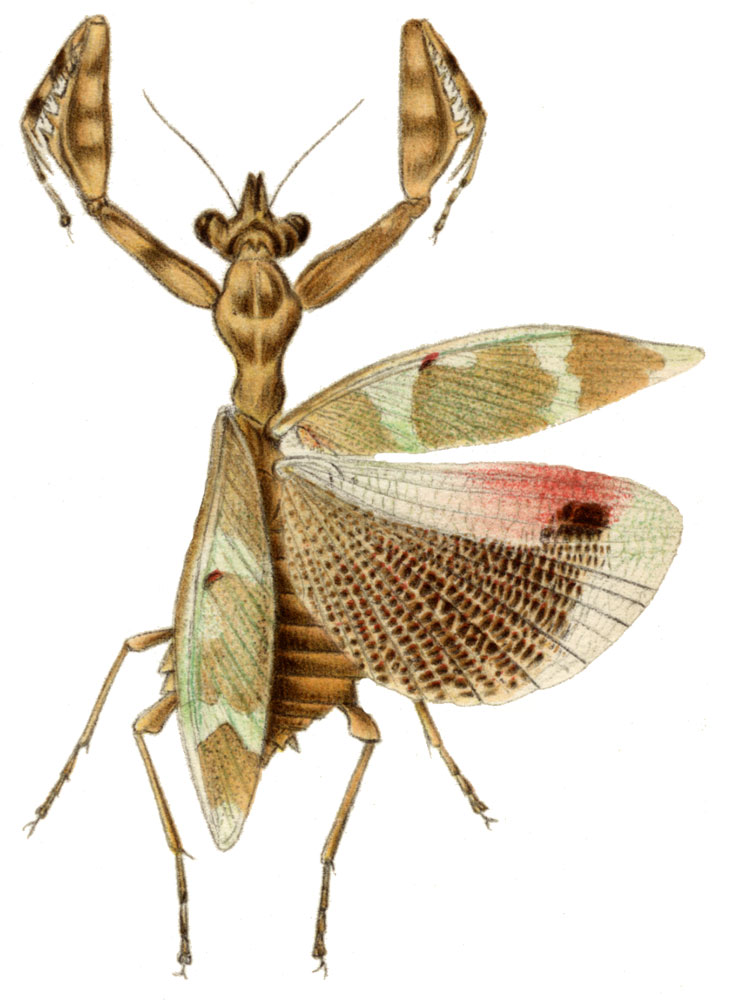
- Adult female

Scientific classification
- Kingdom: Animalia
- Phylum: Arthropoda
- Clade: Pancrustacea
- Class: Insecta
- Order: Mantodea
- Family: Acanthopidae
- Genus: Callibia; Stal, 1877
- Species: C. diana

Binomial name
- Callibia diana (Stoll, 1813)

Synonyms
- (Genus): Anastira Gerstaecker, 1883; (Species): Callibia pictipennis Serville, 1839; Callibia vigilax Westwood, 1889

= Callibia =

Genus of praying mantises

Callibia is a genus of praying mantis in the family Acanthopidae. The genus contains only one species, Callibia diana.

== See also ==
- List of mantis genera and species
