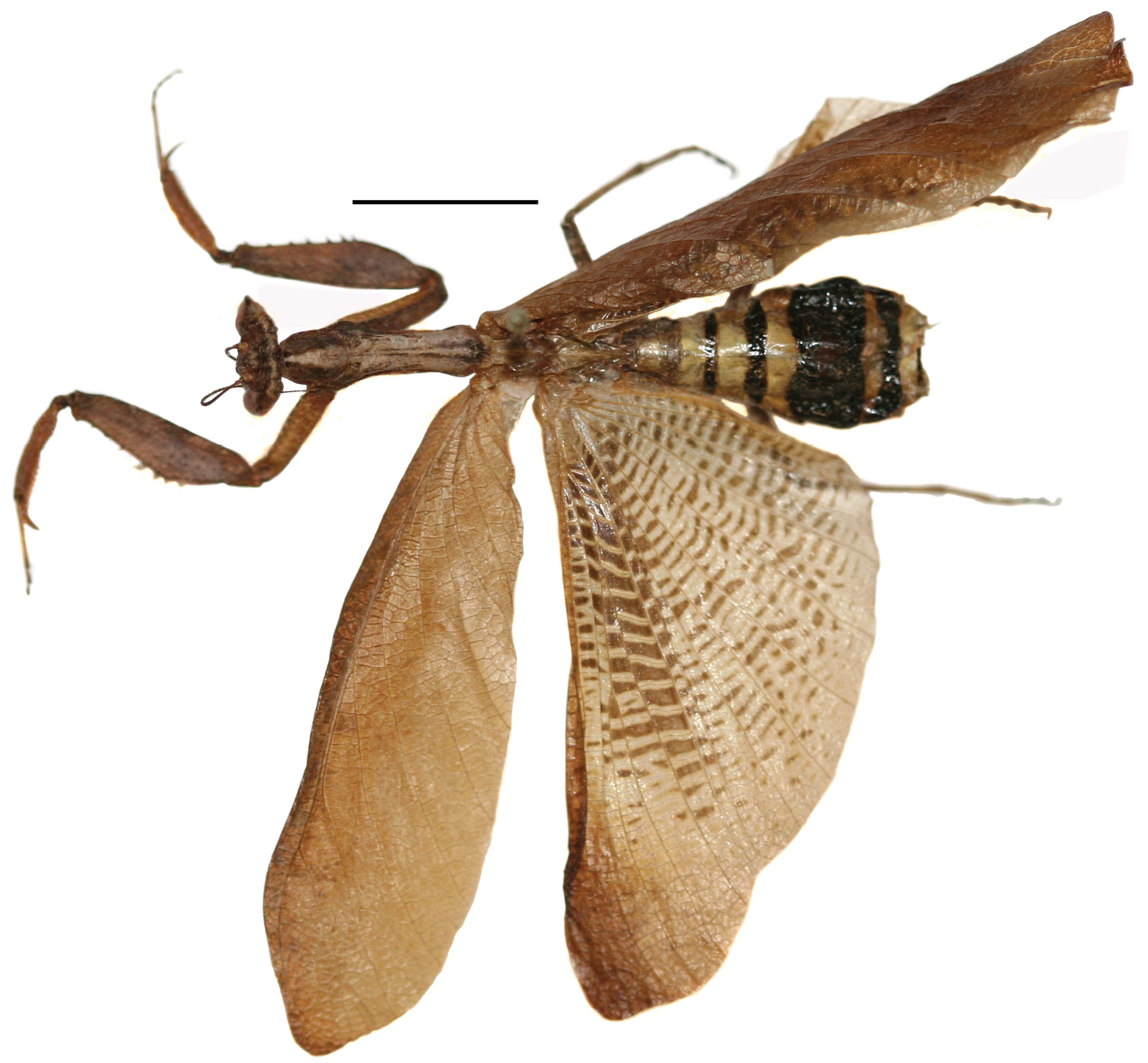
- Adult female Decimiana elliptica holotype

Scientific classification
- Kingdom: Animalia
- Phylum: Arthropoda
- Clade: Pancrustacea
- Class: Insecta
- Order: Mantodea
- Family: Acanthopidae
- Genus: Decimiana; Uvarov, 1940

Synonyms
- Decimia Stal, 1877

= Decimiana =

Genus of praying mantises

Decimiana is a genus of mantises in the family Acanthopidae.

== Species ==
- Decimiana bolivari (Chopard, 1916)
- Decimiana clavata Ippolito & Lombardo, 2004
- Decimiana elliptica Menezes & Bravo, 2012
- Decimiana gaucha Maldaner & Rafael, 2017
- Decimiana hebardi Lombardo, 2000
- Decimiana rehni (Chopard, 1913)
- Decimiana tessellata (Charpentier, 1841)

== See also ==
- List of mantis genera and species
