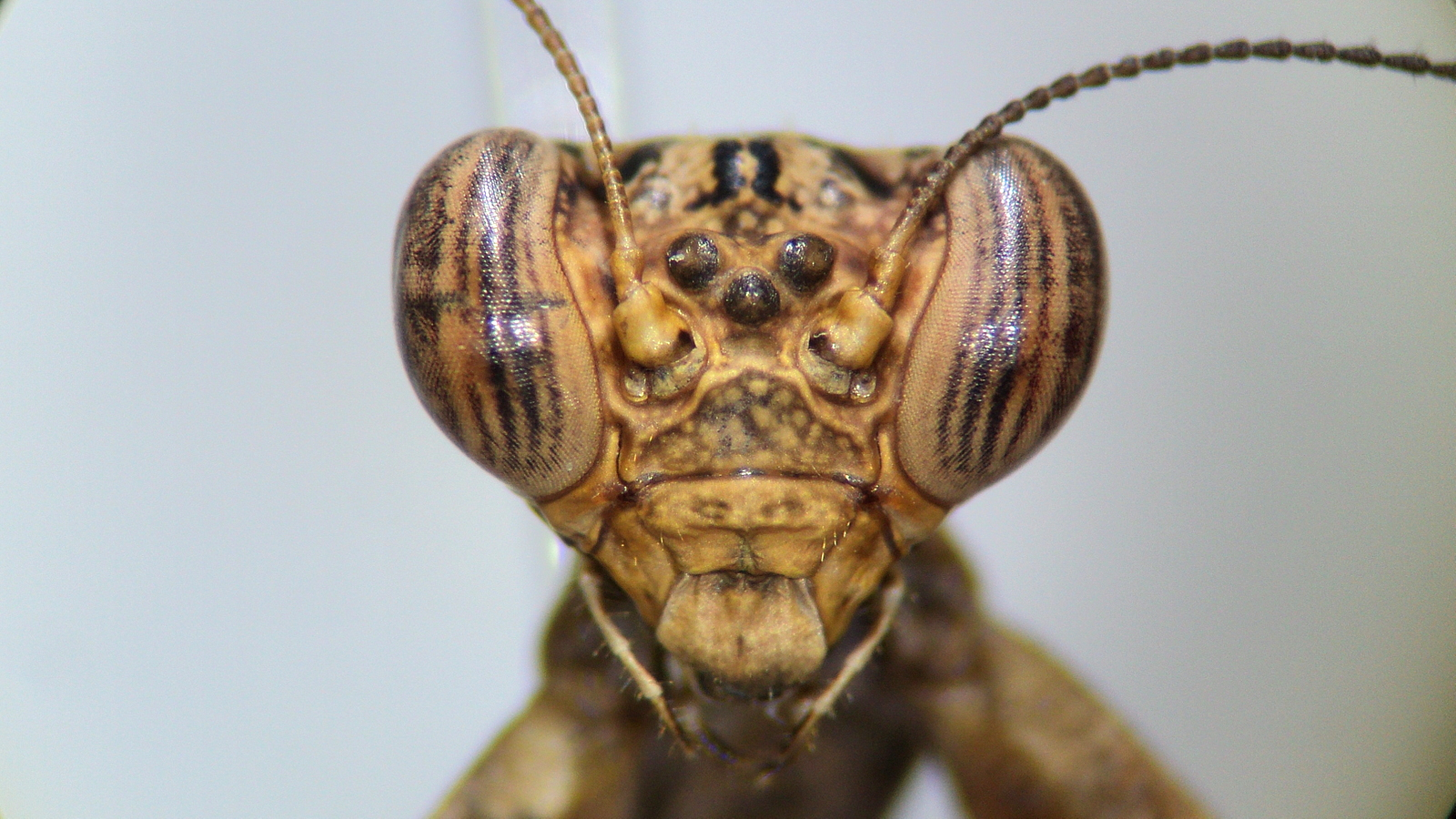
- Raptrix perspicua

Scientific classification
- Kingdom: Animalia
- Phylum: Arthropoda
- Clade: Pancrustacea
- Class: Insecta
- Order: Mantodea
- Family: Acanthopidae
- Tribe: Acontistini

= Acontistini =

Tribe of praying mantises

Acontistini is a tribe of neotropical mantises in the superfamily Acanthopoidea, and family Acanthopidae. There are 7 genera and more than 30 described species in Acontistini. In 2016, several genera were moved from Acanthopidae to a newly created family Acontistidae, but this has not been accepted in most recent classifications.

== Genera ==
- Acontista Saussure, 1872
- Astollia Kirby, 1904
- Callibia Stal, 1877
- Ovalimantis Roy, 2015
- Paratithrone Lombardo, 1996
- Raptrix Terra, 1995
- Tithrone Stal, 1877
