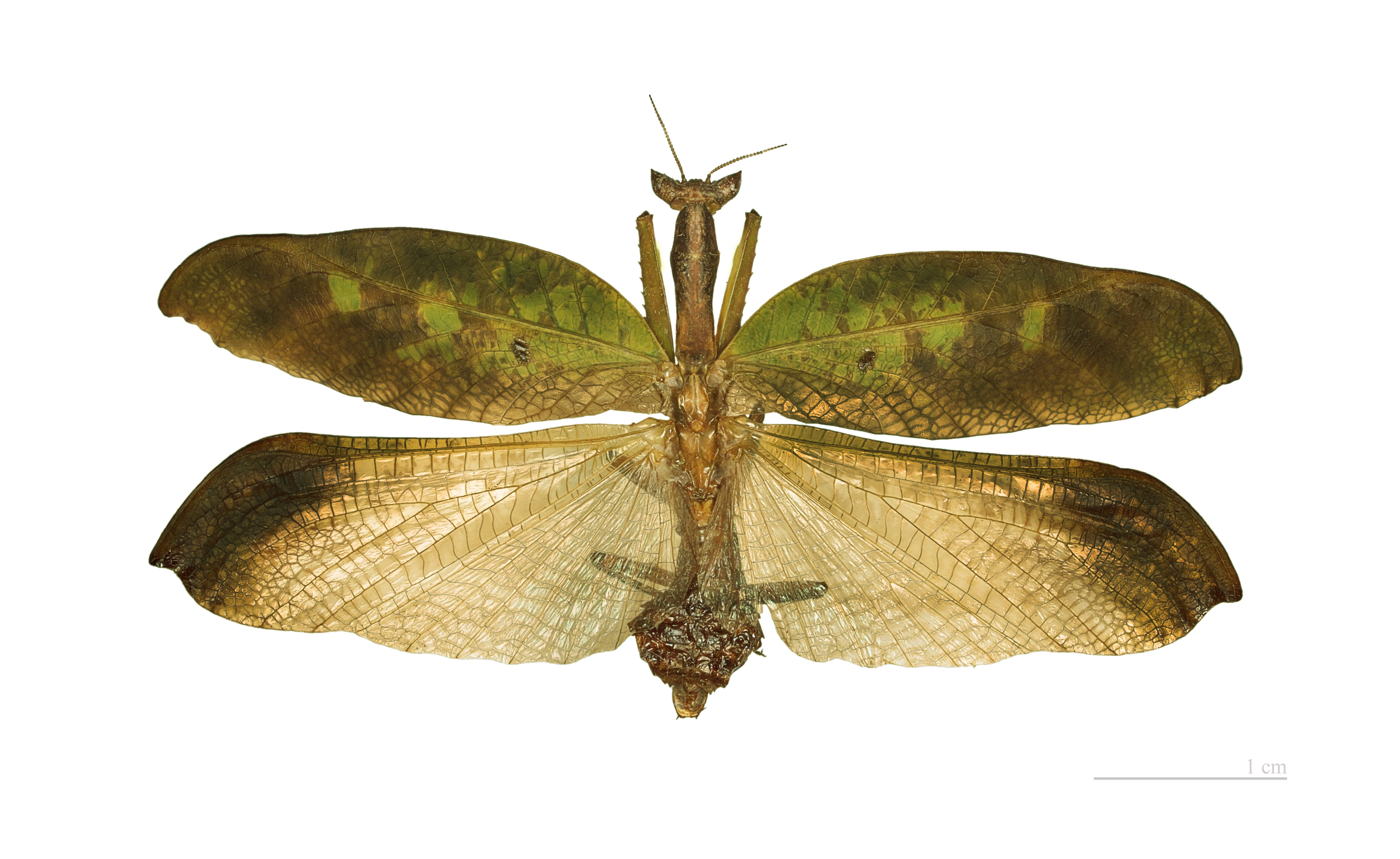
- Metilia brunnerii

Scientific classification
- Kingdom: Animalia
- Phylum: Arthropoda
- Clade: Pancrustacea
- Class: Insecta
- Order: Mantodea
- Superfamily: Acanthopoidea
- Family: Acanthopidae; Schwarz & Roy, 2019

= Acanthopidae =

Family of praying mantises

Acanthopidae (from Ancient Greek ἄκανθα (ákantha), meaning "spine", and ὅψ (óps), meaning "eye") is a family of South American mantises consisting of 16 genera in the order Mantodea. The group was first formally split off as a separate family by the German entomologist Reinhard Ehrmann in 2002. In 2016, five genera (Acontista, Callibia, Paratithrone, Raptrix, and Tithrone) were moved from Acanthopidae to the newly-created family Acontistidae, but this has not been accepted in most recent classifications.

== Genera ==
The following genera are recognised in the family Acanthopidae:

- Acanthops Serville, 1831
- Acontista Saussure, 1872
- Astollia Kirby, 1904
- Callibia Stal, 1877
- Decimiana Uvarov, 1940
- Lagrecacanthops Roy, 2004
- Metacanthops Agudelo, Maldaner & Rafael, 2019
- Metilia Stal, 1877
- Miracanthops Roy, 2004
- Ovalimantis Roy, 2015
- Paratithrone Lombardo, 1996
- Plesiacanthops Chopard, 1913
- Pseudacanthops Saussure, 1870
- Raptrix Terra, 1995
- Stenophylla Westwood, 1845
- Tithrone Stal, 1877

== See also ==
- List of mantis genera and species
