= E. gigantea =

E. gigantea may refer to:

- Epipactis gigantea, the stream orchid or giant helleborine, an orchid species
- Edwardsina gigantea, the giant torrent midge, a fly species endemic to Australia
- Eulagisca gigantea a not so giant ocean worm that lives in the depths of the antarctic and Southern oceans

== See also ==
- Gigantea (disambiguation)
