= V. gigantea =

V. gigantea may refer to:

- Vallisneria gigantea, the eelgrass, an aquatic plant species in the genus Vallisneria
- Vriesea gigantea, a plant species endemic to Brazil

== See also ==
- Gigantea (disambiguation)
