= C. gigantea =

C. gigantea may refer to:

- Callindra gigantea, a moth species
- Calotropis gigantea, the crown flower, a plant species native to Indonesia, Malaysia, Philippines, Thailand and Sri Lanka
- Calvatia gigantea, the giant puffball, a puffball mushroom species
- Carnegiea gigantea, the saguaro, a large tree-sized cactus species
- Coreopsis gigantea, the giant coreopsis, a woody perennial plant native to California and Baja California
- Clanis gigantea, a synonym for Clanis undulosa gigantea, a moth species found in the southern Russian Far East, the Korean Peninsula and north-eastern China
- Condylactis gigantea, a tropical sea anemone species
- Coniogramme gigantea, a fern species
- Cupressus gigantea a conifer species found only in China
- Cyathea gigantea, a tree fern species native to northeastern to southern India, Sri Lanka, Nepal to Myanmar, Thailand and Laos

== See also ==
- Gigantea (disambiguation)
