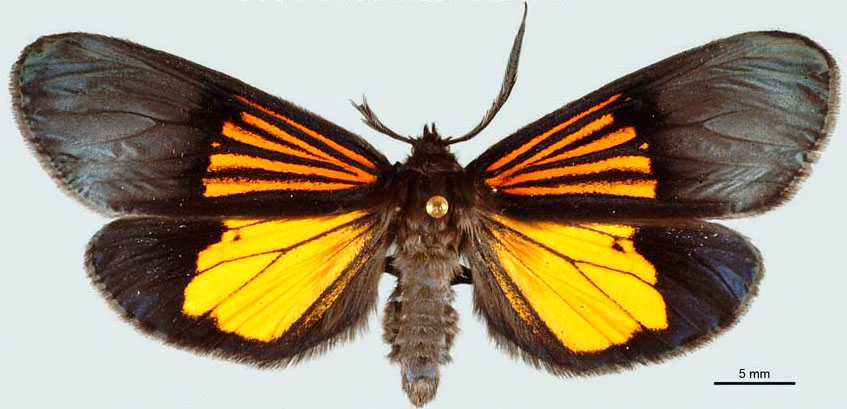

Scientific classification
- Kingdom: Animalia
- Phylum: Arthropoda
- Clade: Pancrustacea
- Class: Insecta
- Order: Lepidoptera
- Superfamily: Noctuoidea
- Family: Notodontidae
- Genus: Scea
- Species: S. discinota

Binomial name
- Scea discinota (Warren, 1900)

Synonyms
- Thirmida discinota (Warren, 1900)

= Scea discinota =

Species of moth

Scea discinota is a moth of the family Notodontidae. It is known almost exclusively from localities close to the city of Mérida in Venezuela. However, there is a single record from the State of Lara. It is engaged in mimicry with Thermidarctia thermidoides.

The length of the forewings is 23–25 mm.

Larva have been recorded on Passiflora bauhinifolia.
