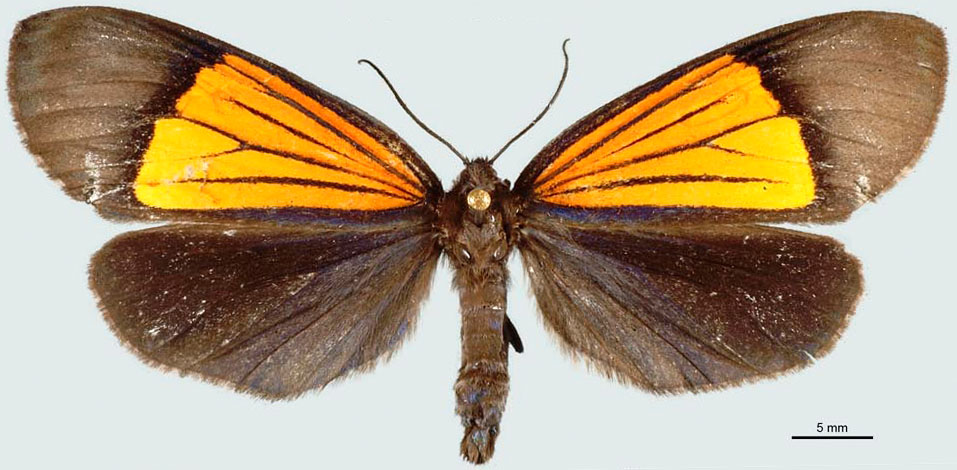
- Female, collected at Machu Picchu in 2001.

Scientific classification
- Kingdom: Animalia
- Phylum: Arthropoda
- Clade: Pancrustacea
- Class: Insecta
- Order: Lepidoptera
- Superfamily: Noctuoidea
- Family: Notodontidae
- Genus: Scea
- Species: S. subcyanea

Binomial name
- Scea subcyanea Prout, 1918

Synonyms
- Scea caesiopicta subcyanea Prout, 1918

= Scea subcyanea =

Species of moth

Scea subcyanea is a moth of the family Notodontidae. It is found in Peru.

== Taxonomic history ==
Louis Beethoven Prout initially described this taxon in 1918 as the subspecies Scea caesiopicta subcyanea; S. caesiopicta is now considered a junior synonym of Scea gigantea. The type locality was given as "Carabaya, S.E. Peru, Oconeque to Aqualani, 6,000–9,000 ft".

James S. Miller elevated S. subcyanea to species level in 2009.
