= T. gigantea =

T. gigantea may refer to:

- Tarchia gigantea, an ankylosaurid dinosaur species from the late Cretaceous of Mongolia
- Tegenaria gigantea, the giant house spider, a spider species
- Thargelia gigantea a moth species found in Morocco, Algeria, Libya, Israel and the Sinai
- Tritonia gigantea, a marine nudibranch gastropod species
- Tyto gigantea, an extinct barn owl species from what is now Gargano, Italy, dating back to the late Miocene

== Synonyms ==
- Thirmida gigantea, a synonym for Scea gigantea, a moth species

== See also ==
- Gigantea (disambiguation)
