= S. gigantea =

S. gigantea may refer to:

- Scea gigantea, a moth species found in South America
- Schizoglossa gigantea, a species of large predatory, air-breathing, land slug
- Scolopendra gigantea, the Peruvian giant yellowleg centipede or Amazonian giant centipede
- Spenceriella gigantea, the North Auckland worm, a rare giant annelid species endemic to New Zealand
- Spongiochloris gigantea, an alga species in the genus Spongiochloris
- Stapelia gigantea, a flowering plant species
- Stichodactyla gigantea, the giant carpet anemone, a species of sea anemone that lives in the Indo-Pacific area
- Strongylura gigantea, the needlefish, a marine fish species

== Synonyms ==
- Sequoia gigantea, a synonym for Sequoiadendron giganteum, a massive tree species

== See also ==
- Gigantea (disambiguation)
