= W. gigantea =

W. gigantea may refer to:

- Werauhia gigantea, a plant species native to Venezuela
- Wittrockia gigantea, a plant species endemic to Brazil

== Synonyms ==
- Wellingtonia gigantea, a synonym for Sequoiadendron giganteum, a massive tree species

== See also ==
- Gigantea (disambiguation)
