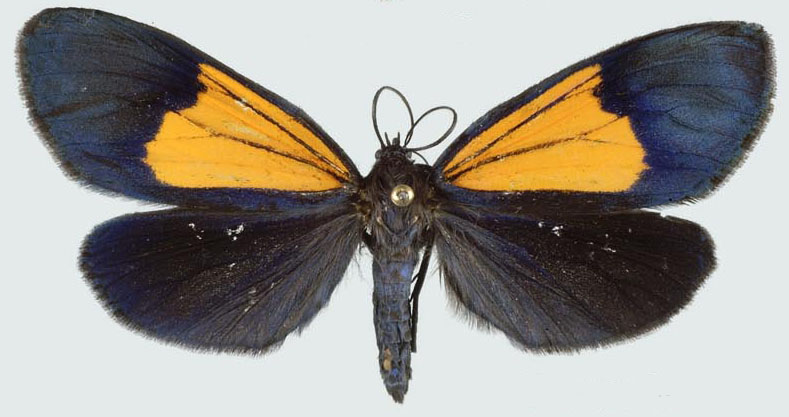

Scientific classification
- Kingdom: Animalia
- Phylum: Arthropoda
- Clade: Pancrustacea
- Class: Insecta
- Order: Lepidoptera
- Superfamily: Noctuoidea
- Family: Notodontidae
- Genus: Scea
- Species: S. superba

Binomial name
- Scea superba (H. Druce, 1890)

= Scea superba =

Species of moth

Scea superba is a moth of the family Notodontidae first described by Herbert Druce in 1890. It is found in South America, including Ecuador.

The larvae feed on Passiflora manicata.
