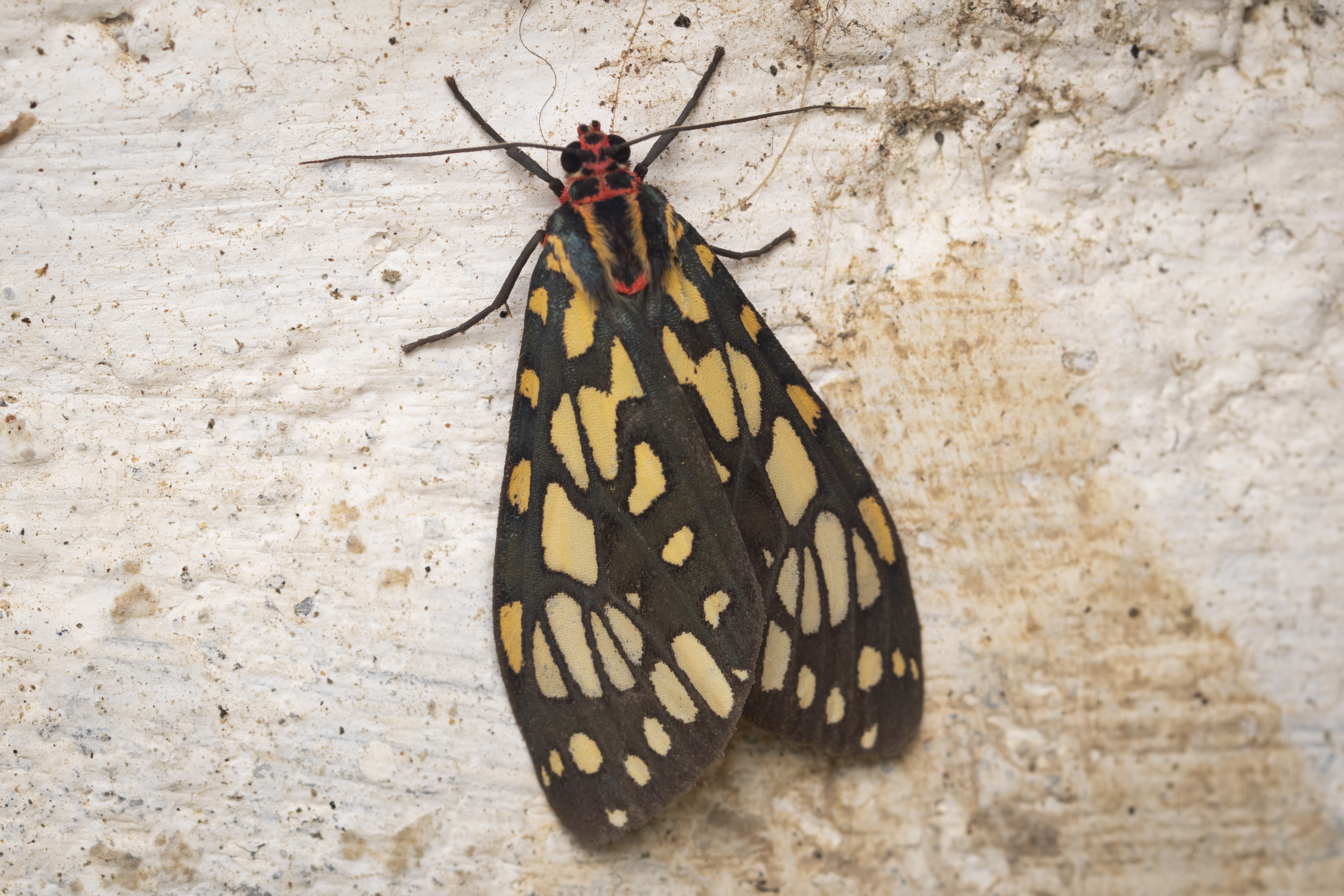

Scientific classification
- Kingdom: Animalia
- Phylum: Arthropoda
- Class: Insecta
- Order: Lepidoptera
- Superfamily: Noctuoidea
- Family: Erebidae
- Subfamily: Arctiinae
- Genus: Callindra
- Species: C. similis

Binomial name
- Callindra similis (Moore, 1879)

Synonyms
- Hypercompa similis Moore, 1879; Eucallimorpha similis; Panaxia similis

= Callindra similis =

Species of moth

Callindra similis is a moth of the family Erebidae. It was described by Frederic Moore in 1879. It is found in India (Sikkim), Nepal, Bhutan and China (Yunnan, Tibet, Sichuan).
