= Callindra principalis =

Scientific classification
- Domain: Eukaryota
- Kingdom: Animalia
- Phylum: Arthropoda
- Class: Insecta
- Order: Lepidoptera
- Superfamily: Noctuoidea
- Family: Erebidae
- Subfamily: Arctiinae
- Genus: Callindra
- Species: C. principalis

Binomial name
- Callindra principalis (Kollar, [1844])

Synonyms
- Euprepia principalis Kollar, [1844]; Eucallimorpha principalis; Panaxia principalis; Hypercompa flavicolor Moore, 1879; Callimorpha principalis ladakensis Reich, 1933; Callimorpha principalis nuristanica Kardakoff, 1937; Callimorpha principalis var. fedtschenkoi Grum-Grshimailo, 1902; Hypercompa principalis var. regalis Leech, 1889; Callimorpha principalis flavicolor Moore, 1879; Callimorpha principalis ladakensis P.Reich, 1933; Callindra principalis ladakensis

Species of moth

Callindra principalis is a moth of the family Erebidae. It was described by Vincenz Kollar in 1844. It is found in the Pamir Mountains, Afghanistan, Pakistan, Kashmir, the Himalayas, Nepal and China (Zhejiang, Jiangxi, Sichuan, Yunan, Tibet).

== Subspecies ==
- Callindra principalis principalis (Pakistan, Kashmir, Himalayas, Nepal)
- Callindra principalis flavicolor (Moore, 1879) (Ladakh)
- Callindra principalis fedtschenkoi (Grum-Grshimailo, 1902) (Tajikistan; China, Xinjiang)
- Callindra principalis nuristanica (Kardakoff, 1937)
- Callindra principalis regalis (Leech, 1889) (China: Zhejiang, Jiangxi, Sichuan, Shaanxi, Hubei, Hunan, Fujian)
