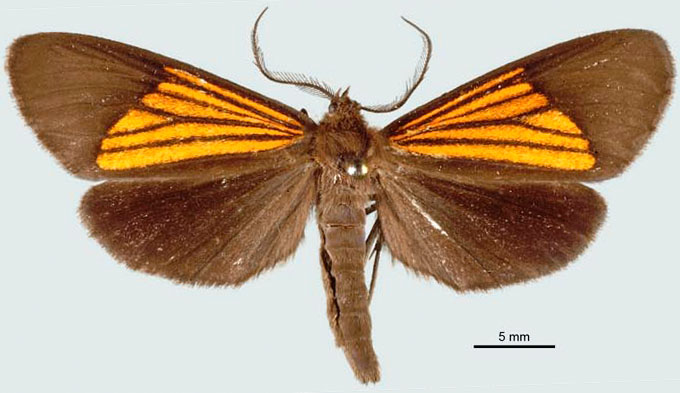

Scientific classification
- Kingdom: Animalia
- Phylum: Arthropoda
- Clade: Pancrustacea
- Class: Insecta
- Order: Lepidoptera
- Superfamily: Noctuoidea
- Family: Notodontidae
- Genus: Scea
- Species: S. cleonica

Binomial name
- Scea cleonica Druce, 1885

= Scea cleonica =

Species of moth

Scea cleonica is a moth of the family Notodontidae. It is found in South America, including and possibly limited to Ecuador.
