= Callindra =

Scientific classification
- Domain: Eukaryota
- Kingdom: Animalia
- Phylum: Arthropoda
- Class: Insecta
- Order: Lepidoptera
- Superfamily: Noctuoidea
- Family: Erebidae
- Subfamily: Arctiinae
- Subtribe: Callimorphina
- Genus: Callindra; Röber, 1925

Synonyms
- Eucallimorpha Dubatolov, 1990

Genus of moths

Callindra is a genus of tiger moths in the family Erebidae described by Röber in 1925. It consists of a number of South and East Asian species, reviewed by Vladimir Viktorovitch Dubatolov and Yasunori Kishida (2006), with the type species, Callindra arginalis.

== Species ==
- Callindra arginalis (Hampson, 1894)
- Callindra equitalis (Kollar, [1844])
- Callindra lenzeni (Daniel, 1943)
- Callindra nepos (Leech, 1899)
- Callindra nyctemerata (Moore, 1879
- Callindra principalis (Kollar, [1844])
- Callindra similis (Moore, 1879
