= G. gigantea =

G. gigantea may refer to:

- Geochelone gigantea, the Aldabra giant tortoise, a reptile species found on the islands of the Aldabra Atoll in the Seychelles
- Grallaria gigantea, the giant antpitta, a perching bird species
- Gymnostachys gigantea, a plant species native to Australia

== See also ==
- Gigantea (disambiguation)
