= Callindra nyctemerata =

Scientific classification
- Domain: Eukaryota
- Kingdom: Animalia
- Phylum: Arthropoda
- Class: Insecta
- Order: Lepidoptera
- Superfamily: Noctuoidea
- Family: Erebidae
- Subfamily: Arctiinae
- Genus: Callindra
- Species: C. nyctemerata

Binomial name
- Callindra nyctemerata (Moore, 1879)

Synonyms
- Hypercompa nyctemerata Moore, 1879; Eucallimorpha nyctemerata; Panaxia nyctemerata

Species of moth

Callindra nyctemerata is a moth of the family Erebidae. It was described by Frederic Moore in 1879. It is found in India, China (Sichuan, Yunnan, Hunan and Tibet).

== Subspecies ==
- Callindra nyctemerata nyctemerata
- Callindra nyctemerata fangchenglaiae Dubatolov et Kishida, 2006
