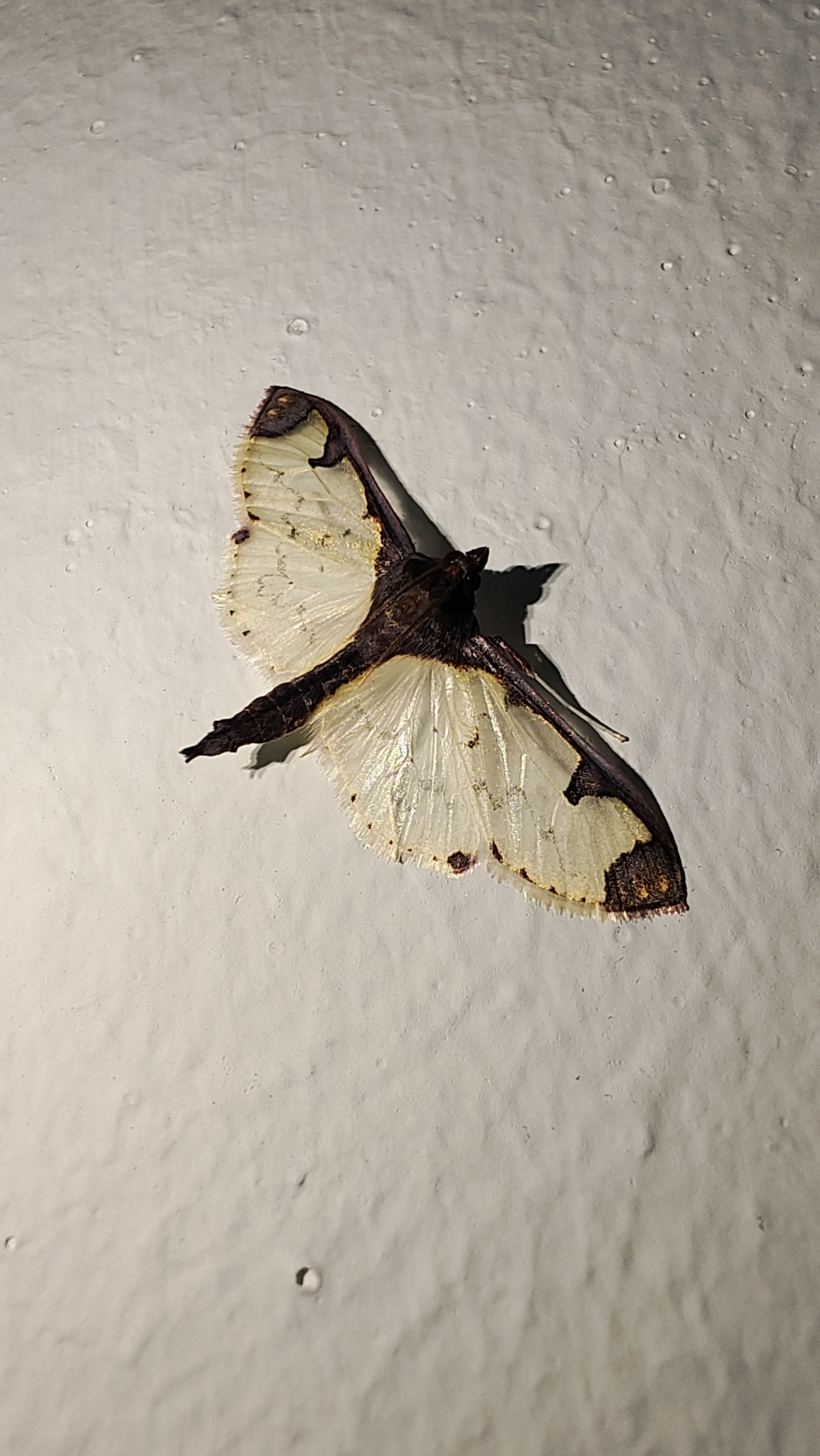

Scientific classification
- Kingdom: Animalia
- Phylum: Arthropoda
- Clade: Pancrustacea
- Class: Insecta
- Order: Lepidoptera
- Family: Crambidae
- Genus: Glyphodes
- Species: G. perelegans

Binomial name
- Glyphodes perelegans (Hampson, 1898)

Synonyms
- Pyrausta perelegans Hampson, 1898

= Glyphodes perelegans =

Species of moth

Glyphodes perelegans is a moth of the family Crambidae described by George Hampson in 1898. It is native to South America, where it is found in the Andes Mountains of Venezuela, Colombia, and Ecuador. It has been introduced to Hawaii to control banana poka (Passiflora tarminiana).

The wingspan is about 40 mm for females and 30 mm for males. The pupa is light brown and about 10 mm long. Pupation lasts about 21 days in the summer and 31 days in the winter.
