= Callindra equitalis =

Scientific classification
- Domain: Eukaryota
- Kingdom: Animalia
- Phylum: Arthropoda
- Class: Insecta
- Order: Lepidoptera
- Superfamily: Noctuoidea
- Family: Erebidae
- Subfamily: Arctiinae
- Genus: Callindra
- Species: C. equitalis

Binomial name
- Callindra equitalis (Kollar, [1844])

Synonyms
- Panaxia equitalis Kollar, [1844]; Eucallimorpha equitalis; Panaxia ochricolor Alphéraky, 1897; Callindra ochricolor; Eucallimorpha ochricolor; Callimorpha equitalis ochricolor

Species of moth

Callindra equitalis is a moth of the family Erebidae. It was described by Vincenz Kollar in 1844. It is found in China (Yunnan, Sichuan, Hunan, Shaanxi), Kashmir, the Himalayas, Sikkim, Nepal and Myanmar.
