= Scea venusta =

Scientific classification
- Kingdom: Animalia
- Phylum: Arthropoda
- Clade: Pancrustacea
- Class: Insecta
- Order: Lepidoptera
- Superfamily: Noctuoidea
- Family: Notodontidae
- Genus: Scea
- Species: S. venusta

Binomial name
- Scea venusta (Dognin, 1900)

Synonyms
- Thirmida venusta Dognin, 1900

Species of moth

Scea venusta is a moth of the family Notodontidae first described by Paul Dognin in 1900. It is found in Ecuador.
