= Eulagisca corrientis =

Scientific classification
- Kingdom: Animalia
- Phylum: Annelida
- Clade: Pleistoannelida
- Subclass: Errantia
- Order: Phyllodocida
- Family: Polynoidae
- Genus: Eulagisca
- Species: E. corrientis

Binomial name
- Eulagisca corrientis McIntosh, 1885

Species of annelid

Eulagisca corrientis is a scale worm known from the subantarctic Heard Island and Kerguelen Island and the Ross Sea in Antarctica, at depths of about 200–1000m.

== Description ==
Eulagisa corrientis has 38 segments and 15 pairs of elytra. The lateral antennae are inserted terminally on anterior margin of the prostomium. The elytra bear a marginal fringe of papillae and the notochaetae are distinctly thicker than the neurochaetae, with bidentate neurochaetae also present.
