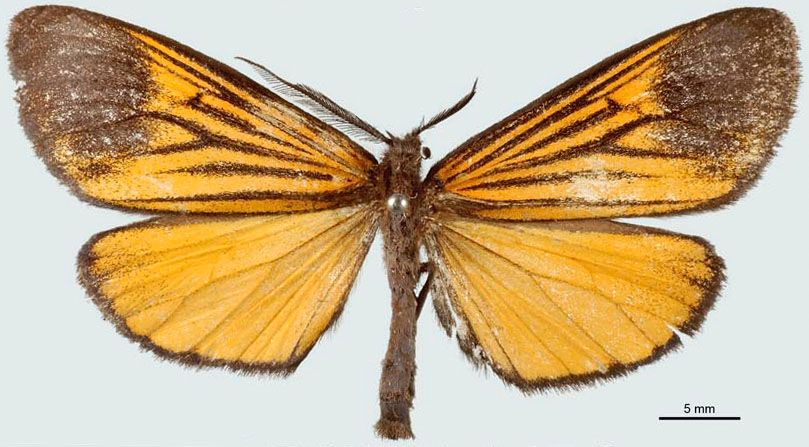

Scientific classification
- Kingdom: Animalia
- Phylum: Arthropoda
- Clade: Pancrustacea
- Class: Insecta
- Order: Lepidoptera
- Superfamily: Noctuoidea
- Family: Notodontidae
- Genus: Scea
- Species: S. circumscripta

Binomial name
- Scea circumscripta (Hering, 1925)

Synonyms
- Thirmida circumscripta Hering, 1925

= Scea circumscripta =

Species of moth

Scea circumscripta is a moth of the family Notodontidae. It is found in South America, including and possibly limited to Colombia.
