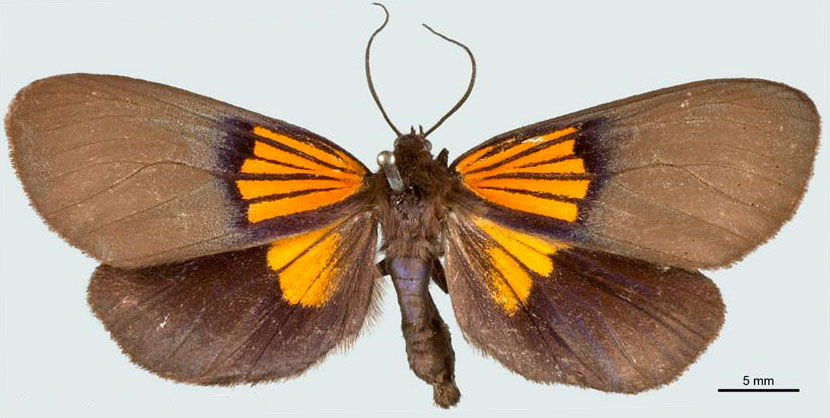

Scientific classification
- Kingdom: Animalia
- Phylum: Arthropoda
- Clade: Pancrustacea
- Class: Insecta
- Order: Lepidoptera
- Superfamily: Noctuoidea
- Family: Notodontidae
- Genus: Scea
- Species: S. grandis

Binomial name
- Scea grandis (H. Druce, 1900)

Synonyms
- Brachyglene grandis H. Druce, 1900; Thirmida grandis (H. Druce, 1900)

= Scea grandis =

Species of moth

Scea grandis is a moth of the family Notodontidae first described by Herbert Druce in 1900. It is found in South America, including and possibly limited to Colombia.
