= Wittrockia superba =

Scientific classification
- Kingdom: Plantae
- Clade: Tracheophytes
- Clade: Angiosperms
- Clade: Monocots
- Clade: Commelinids
- Order: Poales
- Family: Bromeliaceae
- Genus: Wittrockia
- Species: W. superba

Binomial name
- Wittrockia superba Lindm.

Synonyms
- Canistrum superbum (Lindm.) Mez; Nidularium superbum (Lindm.) Ule; Canistrum cruentum F.Muell.; Nidularium wawreanum Mez

Species of flowering plant

Canistrum superbum (Wittrockia superba)

Wittrockia superba is a species of flowering plant in the family Bromeliaceae. The bromeliad is endemic to the Atlantic Forest biome (Mata Atlantica Brasileira), located in southeastern Brazil. It is native within Paraná (state), Rio de Janeiro (state), Santa Catarina (state), and São Paulo (state).

It is an Endangered species in its natural habitats.
