= Callindra lenzeni =

Scientific classification
- Domain: Eukaryota
- Kingdom: Animalia
- Phylum: Arthropoda
- Class: Insecta
- Order: Lepidoptera
- Superfamily: Noctuoidea
- Family: Erebidae
- Subfamily: Arctiinae
- Genus: Callindra
- Species: C. lenzeni

Binomial name
- Callindra lenzeni (Daniel, 1943)

Synonyms
- Callimorpha lenzeni Daniel, 1943; Panaxia lenzeni; Eucallimorpha lenzeni

Species of moth

Callindra lenzeni is a moth of the family Erebidae. It was described by Franz Daniel in 1943. It is found in Yunnan, China.
