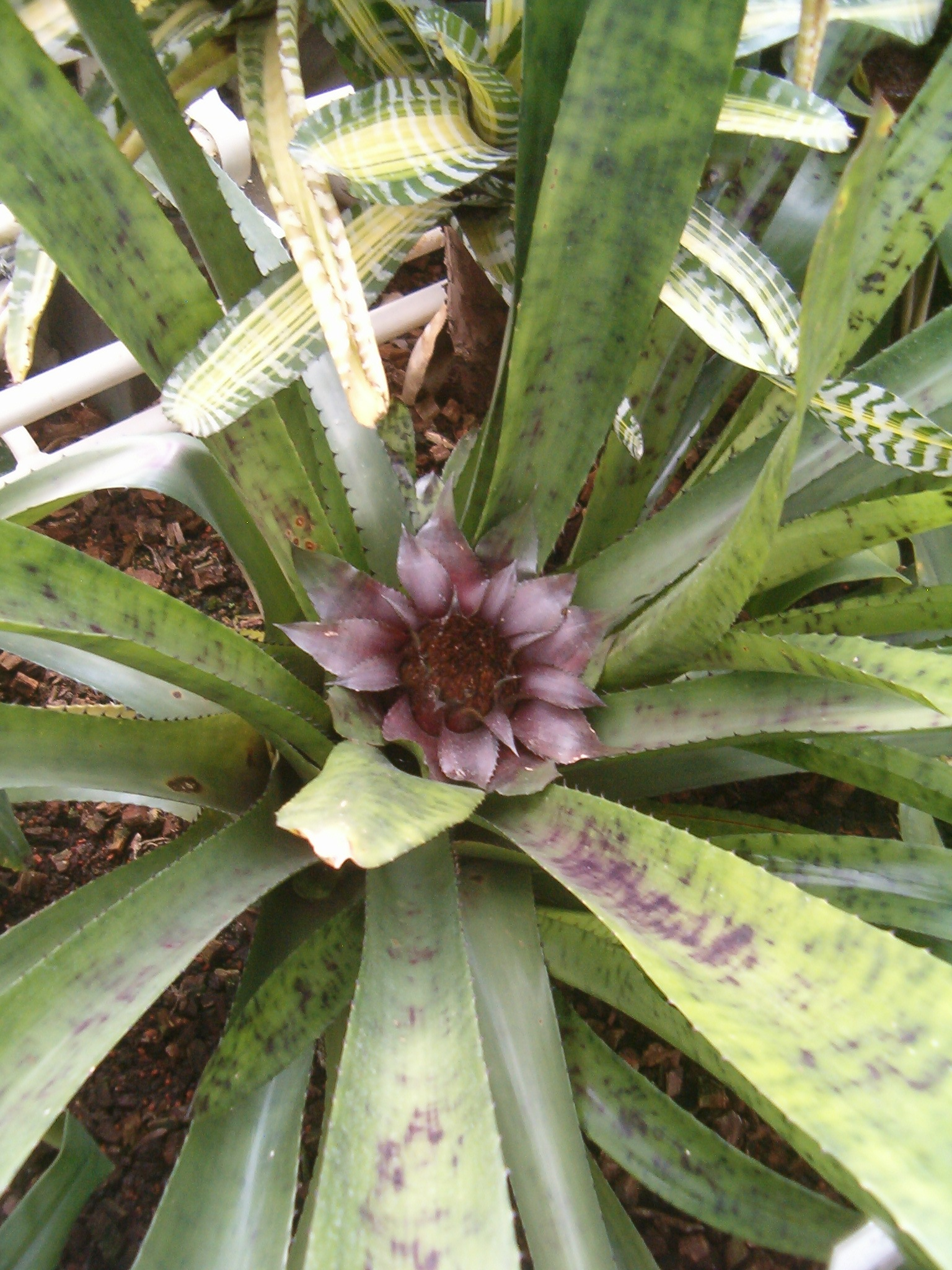

Scientific classification
- Kingdom: Plantae
- Clade: Tracheophytes
- Clade: Angiosperms
- Clade: Monocots
- Clade: Commelinids
- Order: Poales
- Family: Bromeliaceae
- Subfamily: Bromelioideae
- Genus: Wittrockia; Lindm.

Species
- See text

= Wittrockia =

Genus of flowering plants

Wittrockia is a genus of plants in the family Bromeliaceae, subfamily Bromelioideae.

The genus name is for Veit Brecher Wittrock, a Swedish botanist (1839–1914).

These plants are native to Central America and South America. Many species are endemic to the Atlantic Forest biome (Mata Atlantica Brasileira), located in southeastern Brazil.

== Description ==
Wittrockia is large among bromeliad genera, producing long, glossy leaves armed with sharp spines. Forming rosettes over 1 meter in diameter, the foliage may contain various colors of spots and banding, depending on species.

Their inflorescence blooms deep in the vase where the plant catches water.

=== Species ===
- Wittrockia cyathiformis (Vellozo) Leme
- Wittrockia flavipetala (Wand.) Leme & H.Luther
- Wittrockia gigantea (Baker) Leme
- Wittrockia paulistana Leme
- Wittrockia spiralipetala Leme
- Wittrockia superba Lindman
- Wittrockia tenuisepala (Leme) Leme

== Cultivation ==
Wittrockia species are adaptable to varying climates and light exposure. Their attractive foliage has made them popular in cultivation as an ornamental plant.
