= M. gigantea =

M. gigantea may refer to:

- Macaranga gigantea, the elephant ear tree
- Manis gigantea, the giant pangolin, a mammal species found in Africa
- Megateuthis gigantea, the largest known belemnite species found in Europe and Asia
- Melampitta gigantea, the greater melampitta, a bird species
- Myristica gigantea, a plant species found in Indonesia and Malaysia

== See also ==
- Gigantea (disambiguation)
