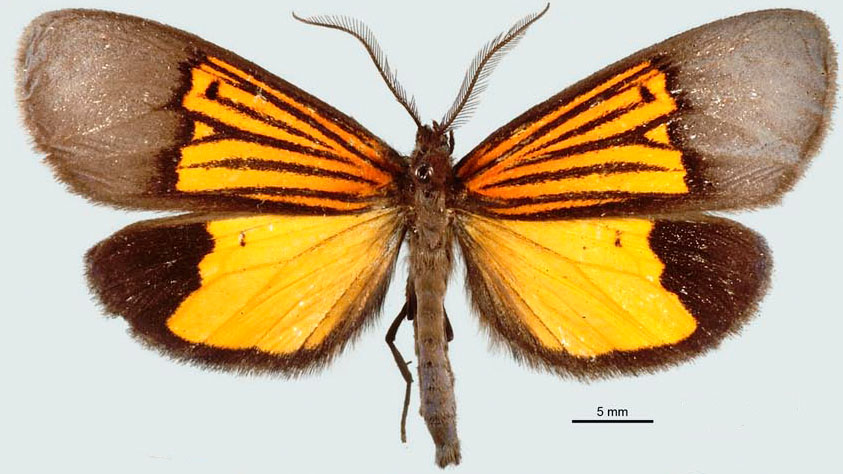

Scientific classification
- Kingdom: Animalia
- Phylum: Arthropoda
- Clade: Pancrustacea
- Class: Insecta
- Order: Lepidoptera
- Superfamily: Noctuoidea
- Family: Notodontidae
- Genus: Scea
- Species: S. dimidiata

Binomial name
- Scea dimidiata (Walker, 1854)

Synonyms
- Thirmida dimidiata Walker, 1854

= Scea dimidiata =

Species of moth

Scea dimidiata is a moth of the family Notodontidae. It is found in South America, including and possibly limited to Colombia.
