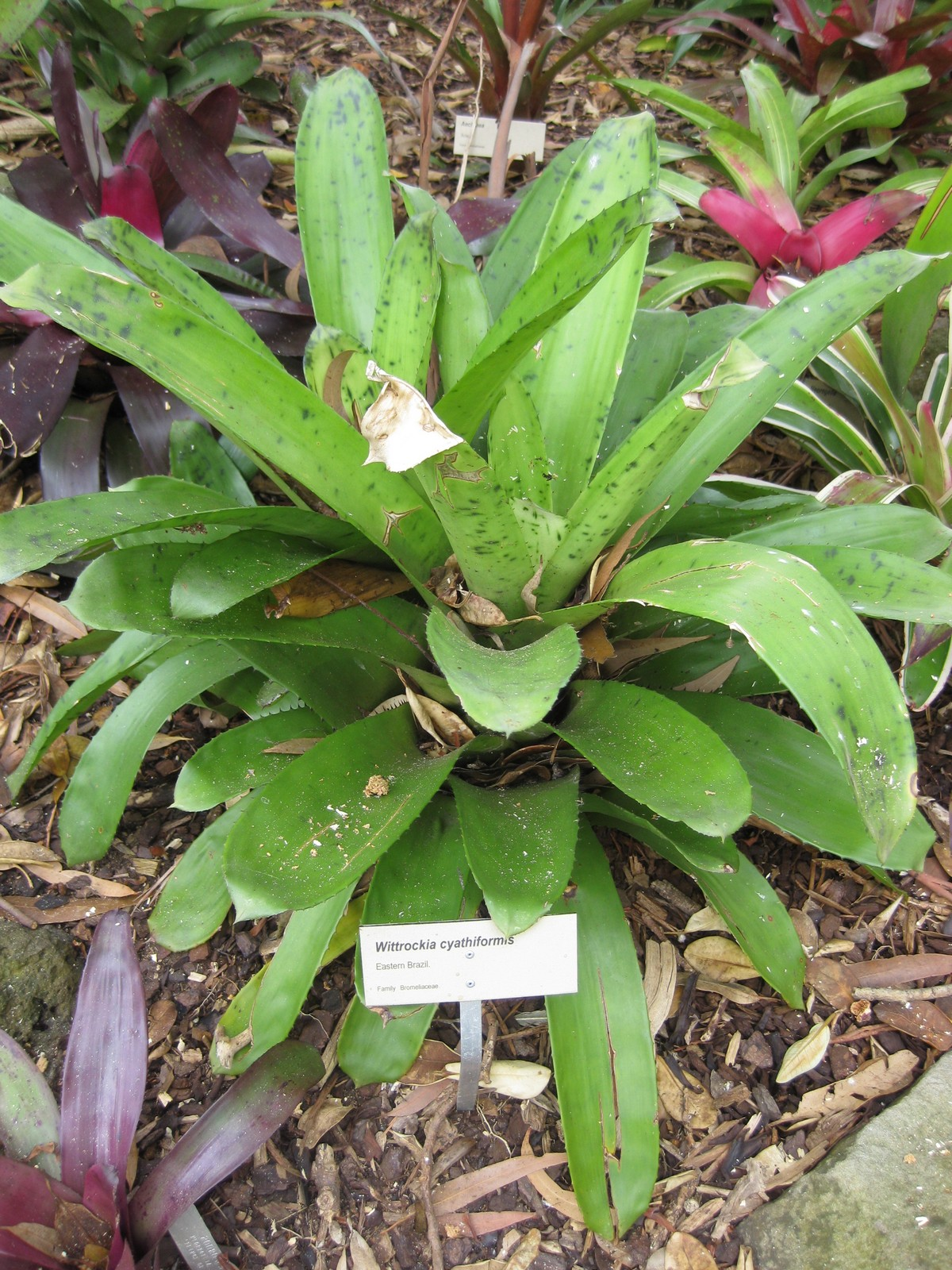
- Wittrockia cyathiformis

Scientific classification
- Kingdom: Plantae
- Clade: Tracheophytes
- Clade: Angiosperms
- Clade: Monocots
- Clade: Commelinids
- Order: Poales
- Family: Bromeliaceae
- Genus: Wittrockia
- Species: W. cyathiformis

Binomial name
- Wittrockia cyathiformis (Vellozo) Leme

= Wittrockia cyathiformis =

Species of flowering plant

Wittrockia cyathiformis is a plant species in the genus Wittrockia.

The bromeliad is endemic to the Atlantic Forest biome (Mata Atlantica Brasileira), located in southeastern Brazil.
