= Agathon comstocki =

Scientific classification
- Domain: Eukaryota
- Kingdom: Animalia
- Phylum: Arthropoda
- Class: Insecta
- Order: Diptera
- Family: Blephariceridae
- Genus: Agathon
- Species: A. comstocki

Binomial name
- Agathon comstocki (Kellogg, 1903)

Synonyms
- Bibiocephala canadensis Garrett, 1922

Species of fly

Agathon comstocki is a species of net-winged midges in the family Blephariceridae.
