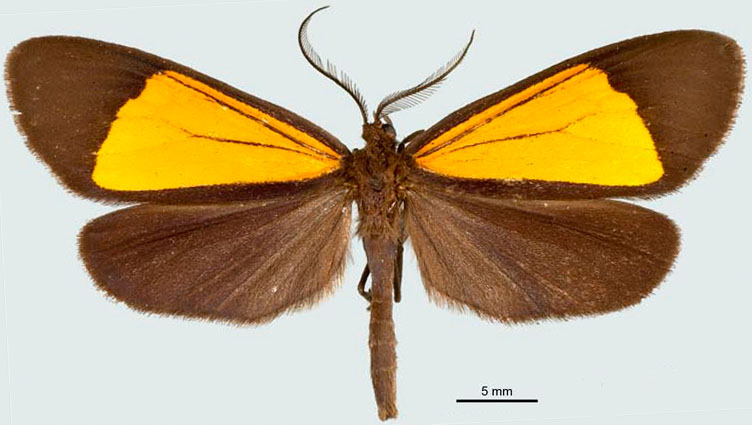

Scientific classification
- Kingdom: Animalia
- Phylum: Arthropoda
- Clade: Pancrustacea
- Class: Insecta
- Order: Lepidoptera
- Superfamily: Noctuoidea
- Family: Notodontidae
- Genus: Scea
- Species: S. servula

Binomial name
- Scea servula Warren, 1901

= Scea servula =

Species of moth

Scea servula is a moth of the family Notodontidae. It is found in South America, including and possibly limited to Colombia.
