= Agathon (fly) =

Scientific classification
- Kingdom: Animalia
- Phylum: Arthropoda
- Clade: Pancrustacea
- Class: Insecta
- Order: Diptera
- Family: Blephariceridae
- Genus: Agathon; Rodor, 1890

Genus of flies

Agathon is a genus of net-winged midges in the family Blephariceridae. There are about 19 described species in Agathon.

== Species ==
These 19 species belong to the genus Agathon:

- Agathon arizonicus (Alexander, 1958)^{i c g}
- Agathon aylmeri (Garrett, 1923)^{i c g}
- Agathon bilobatoides (Kitakami, 1931)^{c g}
- Agathon bispinus (Kitakami, 1931)^{c g}
- Agathon comstocki (Kellogg, 1903)^{i c g b}
- Agathon decorilarva (Brodskij, 1954)^{c g}
- Agathon dismalea (Hogue, 1970)^{i c g}
- Agathon doanei (Kellogg, 1900)^{i c g}
- Agathon elegantulus Roder, 1890^{i c g}
- Agathon eoasiaticus (Brodskij, 1954)^{c g}
- Agathon ezoensis (Kitakami, 1950)^{c}
- Agathon iyaensis (Kitakami, 1931)^{c g}
- Agathon japonicus (Alexander, 1922)^{c g}
- Agathon kawamurai (Kitakami, 1950)^{c g}
- Agathon longispinus (Kitakami, 1931)^{c g}
- Agathon markii (Garrett, 1925)^{i c g}
- Agathon montanus (Kitakami, 1931)^{c g}
- Agathon sequoiarum (Alexander, 1952)^{i c g}
- Agathon setosus Zwick & Arefina, 2005^{c g}

Data sources: i = ITIS, c = Catalogue of Life, g = GBIF, b = Bugguide.net
