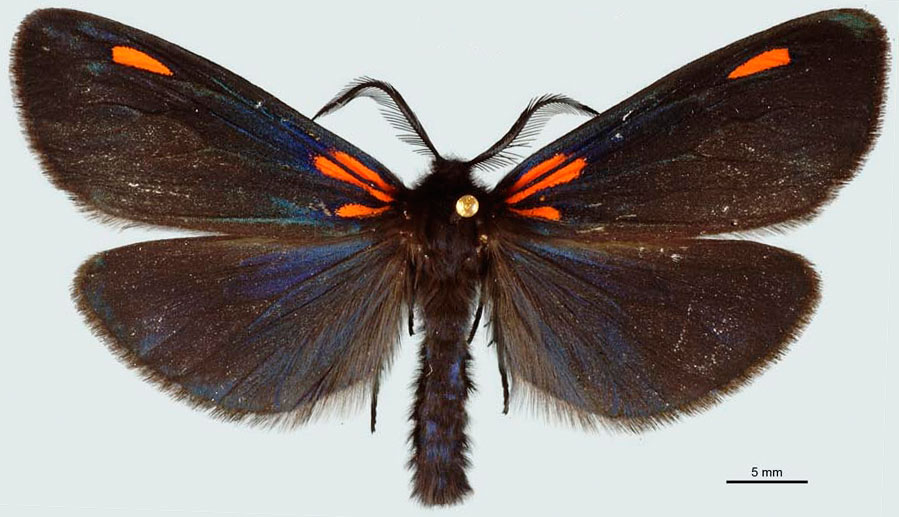

Scientific classification
- Kingdom: Animalia
- Phylum: Arthropoda
- Clade: Pancrustacea
- Class: Insecta
- Order: Lepidoptera
- Superfamily: Noctuoidea
- Family: Notodontidae
- Genus: Scea
- Species: S. bellona

Binomial name
- Scea bellona (Druce, 1906)

Synonyms
- Tuina bellona Druce, 1906

= Scea bellona =

Species of moth

Scea bellona is a moth of the family Notodontidae. It is found in South America, including and possibly limited to Peru.
