= Callindra nepos =

Scientific classification
- Domain: Eukaryota
- Kingdom: Animalia
- Phylum: Arthropoda
- Class: Insecta
- Order: Lepidoptera
- Superfamily: Noctuoidea
- Family: Erebidae
- Subfamily: Arctiinae
- Genus: Callindra
- Species: C. nepos

Binomial name
- Callindra nepos (Leech, 1899)

Synonyms
- Callimorpha nepos Leech, 1899; Panaxia nepos; Callimorpha eques P. Reich, 1932; Eucallimorpha nehos; Eucallimorpha nepos; Eucallimorpha eques

Species of moth

Callindra nepos is a moth of the family Erebidae. It was described by John Henry Leech in 1899. It is found in China and India (Sikkim).
