= R. gigantea =

R. gigantea may refer to:

- Rhomborhina gigantea, a beetle species in the genus Rhomborhina
- Rhynchostylis gigantea, an orchid species found in Myanmar and Thailand
- Rivetina gigantea, a praying mantis species
- Rosa gigantea, a rose species native to northeast India, northern Myanmar and southwest China

== See also ==
- Gigantea (disambiguation)
