= Thermidarctia thirmida =

Scientific classification
- Kingdom: Animalia
- Phylum: Arthropoda
- Clade: Pancrustacea
- Class: Insecta
- Order: Lepidoptera
- Superfamily: Noctuoidea
- Family: Erebidae
- Subfamily: Arctiinae
- Genus: Thermidarctia
- Species: T. thirmida

Binomial name
- Thermidarctia thirmida (Hering, 1926)

Synonyms
- Crocomela thirmida Hering, 1926

Species of moth

Thermidarctia thirmida is a moth in the subfamily Arctiinae. It was first described by Hering in 1926 and is found in Brazil.
