= Eulagisca puschkini =

Scientific classification
- Domain: Eukaryota
- Kingdom: Animalia
- Phylum: Annelida
- Clade: Pleistoannelida
- Subclass: Errantia
- Order: Phyllodocida
- Family: Polynoidae
- Genus: Eulagisca
- Species: E. puschkini

Binomial name
- Eulagisca puschkini Averincev, 1972

Species of annelid

Eulagisca puschkini is a scale worm that is only known from a single specimen collected at a depth of 32m by a SCUBA diver in the Ross Sea.

== Description ==
Eulagisa puschkini has 40 segments and 15 pairs of elytra, and has a brownish pigment (though the patterning is not clear). Lateral antennae are inserted terminally on the anterior margin of the prostomium. Notochaetae are distinctly thicker than neurochaetae, and bidentate neurochaetae are present.
