= D. gigantea =

D. gigantea may refer to:

- Dasyatis gigantea, the giant stumptail stingray, a fish species
- Dendroseris gigantea, synonym of Sonchus lobatiflorus, a flowering plant species found only in the Juan Fernández Islands
- Dinocrocuta gigantea, an extinct hyena-like feliform carnivore species that lived in Asia and Africa during the Miocene epoch
- Dinoponera gigantea, the world's largest species of ant found only in South America
- Drechslera gigantea, a plant pathogen that causes eyespot disease on many host plants
- Drosera gigantea, the giant sundew, an erect perennial tuberous plant species

== See also ==
- Gigantea (disambiguation)
