= Bibiocephala grandis =

Scientific classification
- Domain: Eukaryota
- Kingdom: Animalia
- Phylum: Arthropoda
- Class: Insecta
- Order: Diptera
- Family: Blephariceridae
- Genus: Bibiocephala
- Species: B. grandis

Binomial name
- Bibiocephala grandis Osten Sacken, 1874

Synonyms
- Bibiocephala kelloggi Garrett, 1922; Bibiocephala nigripes Alexander, 1965; Bibionus griseus Curran, 1923

Species of fly

Bibiocephala grandis is a species of net-winged midges in the family Blephariceridae.
