= Wittrockia tenuisepala =

Scientific classification
- Kingdom: Plantae
- Clade: Tracheophytes
- Clade: Angiosperms
- Clade: Monocots
- Clade: Commelinids
- Order: Poales
- Family: Bromeliaceae
- Genus: Wittrockia
- Species: W. tenuisepala

Binomial name
- Wittrockia tenuisepala (Leme) Leme

Species of flowering plant

Wittrockia tenuisepala is a plant species in the genus Wittrockia.

This bromeliad is endemic to the Atlantic Forest biome (Mata Atlantica Brasileira) within Minas Gerais state, located in southeastern Brazil.
