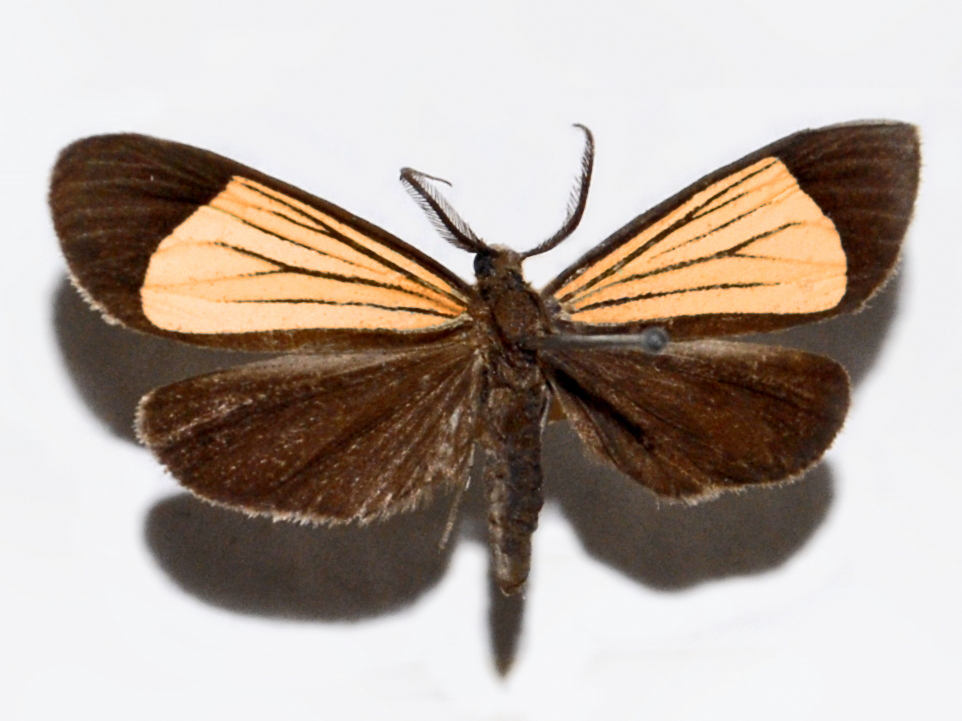

Scientific classification
- Kingdom: Animalia
- Phylum: Arthropoda
- Clade: Pancrustacea
- Class: Insecta
- Order: Lepidoptera
- Superfamily: Noctuoidea
- Family: Notodontidae
- Genus: Scea
- Species: S. auriflamma

Binomial name
- Scea auriflamma (Geyer, [1827])

Synonyms
- Josia auriflamma Geyer, [1827]

= Scea auriflamma =

Species of moth

Scea auriflamma is a moth of the family Notodontidae first described by Carl Geyer in 1827. It is found in[South America, including and possibly limited to Brazil.

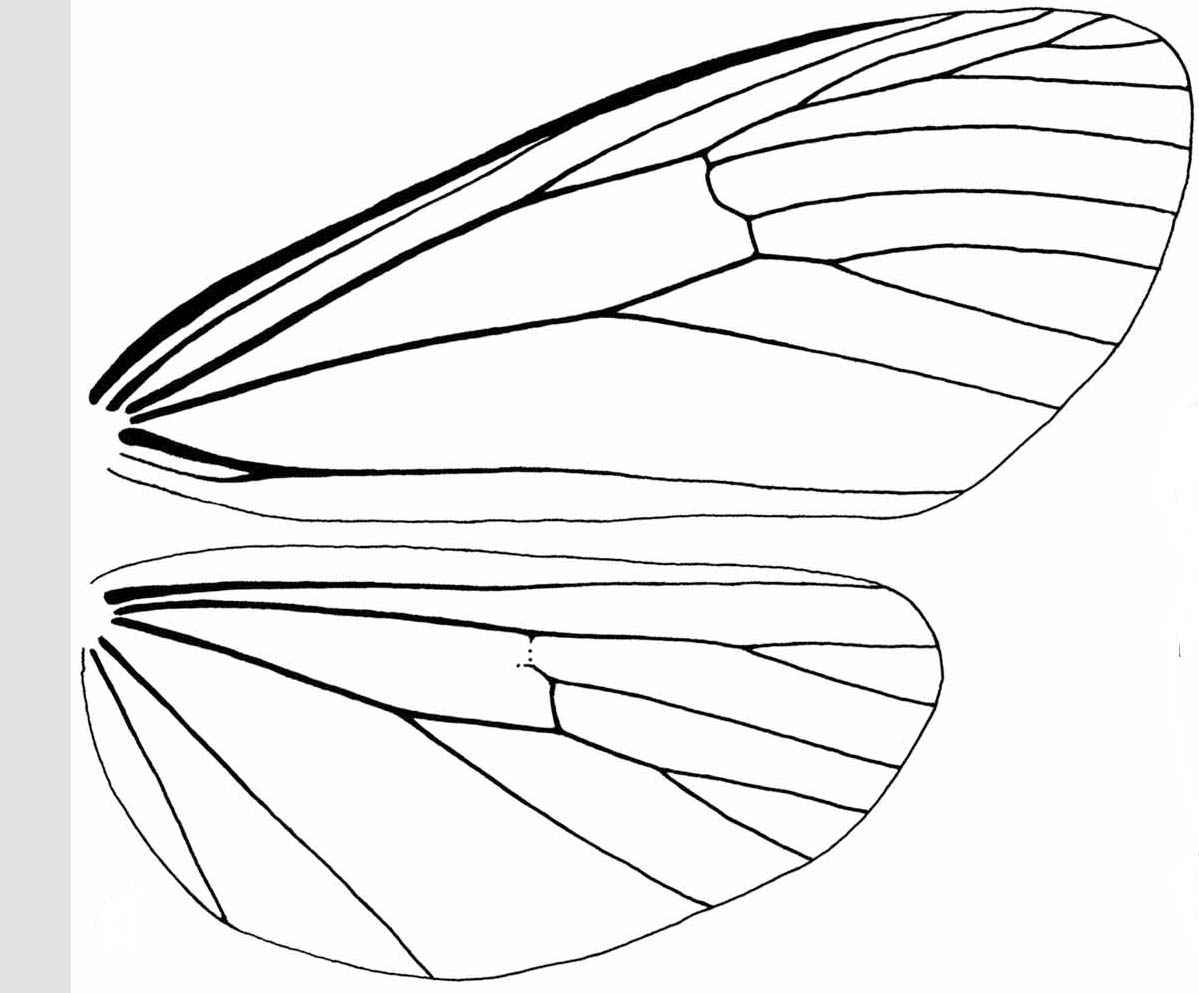
Wing venation

Larvae have been recorded on Passiflora species.
