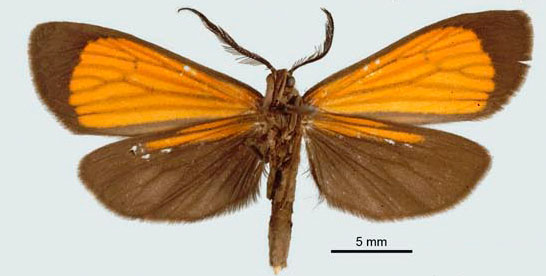

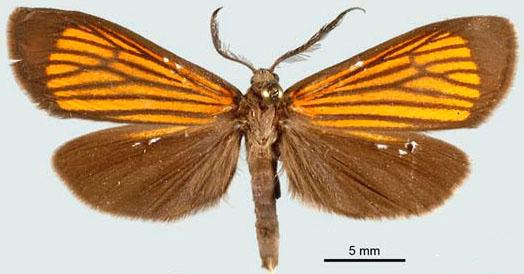

Scientific classification
- Kingdom: Animalia
- Phylum: Arthropoda
- Clade: Pancrustacea
- Class: Insecta
- Order: Lepidoptera
- Superfamily: Noctuoidea
- Family: Notodontidae
- Genus: Scea
- Species: S. angustimargo

Binomial name
- Scea angustimargo Warren, 1905

= Scea angustimargo =

Species of moth

Scea angustimargo is a moth of the family Notodontidae. It is found in South America, including and possibly limited to Peru.
