= Bibiocephala =

Scientific classification
- Domain: Eukaryota
- Kingdom: Animalia
- Phylum: Arthropoda
- Class: Insecta
- Order: Diptera
- Family: Blephariceridae
- Genus: Bibiocephala; Osten-Sacken, 1874

Genus of flies

Bibiocephala is a genus of net-winged midges in the family Blephariceridae. There are about five described species in Bibiocephala.

== Species ==
These five species belong to the genus Bibiocephala:

- Bibiocephala grandis Osten Sacken, 1874
- Bibiocephala infuscata (Matsumura, 1916)
- Bibiocephala komaensis (Kitakami, 1950)
- Bibiocephala maxima Brodskij, 1954
- Bibiocephala minor Kitakami, 1931
