= Gigantea =

Gigantea may refer to:

== Genera ==
- Gigantea (alga), a genus of brown algae in the family Laminariaceae
- Gigantea (flatworm), a genus of planarians in the family Geoplanidae

== Species ==
- C. gigantea (disambiguation)
- D. gigantea (disambiguation)
- E. gigantea (disambiguation)
- G. gigantea (disambiguation)
- M. gigantea (disambiguation)
- P. gigantea (disambiguation)
- R. gigantea (disambiguation)
- S. gigantea (disambiguation)
- T. gigantea (disambiguation)
- V. gigantea (disambiguation)
- W. gigantea (disambiguation)

== See also ==
- List of Latin and Greek words commonly used in systematic names#giganteus
