= Wittrockia paulistana =

Scientific classification
- Kingdom: Plantae
- Clade: Tracheophytes
- Clade: Angiosperms
- Clade: Monocots
- Clade: Commelinids
- Order: Poales
- Family: Bromeliaceae
- Genus: Wittrockia
- Species: W. paulistana

Binomial name
- Wittrockia paulistana Leme

Species of flowering plant

Wittrockia paulistana is a plant species in the genus Wittrockia. This species is endemic to Brazil.

The bromeliad is endemic to the Atlantic Forest biome (Mata Atlantica Brasileira) and to São Paulo (state), located in southeastern Brazil.
