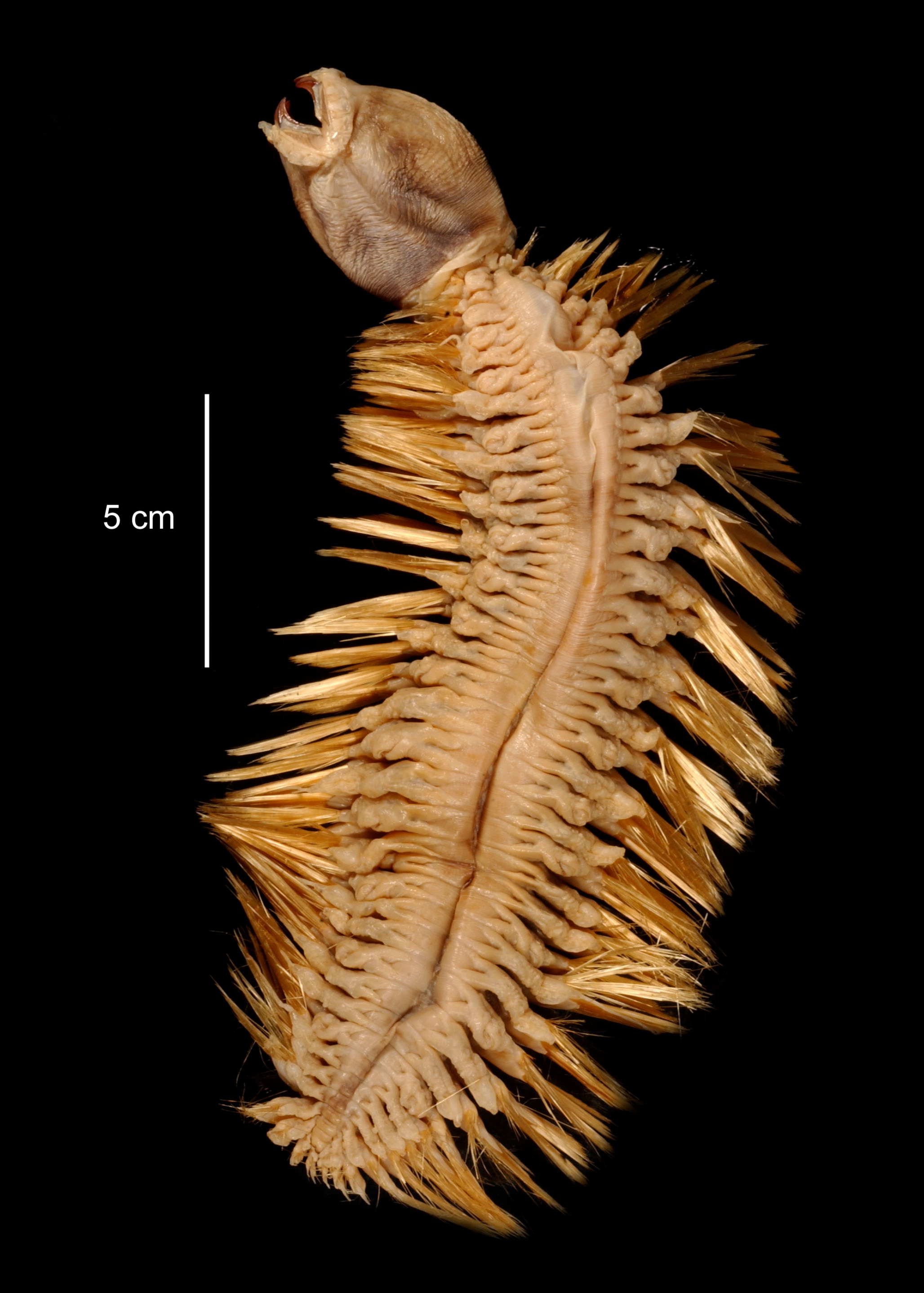
- Specimen of Eulagisca gigantea, at the Smithsonian Oceanographic Sorting Center

Scientific classification
- Kingdom: Animalia
- Phylum: Annelida
- Clade: Pleistoannelida
- Subclass: Errantia
- Order: Phyllodocida
- Family: Polynoidae
- Genus: Eulagisca; McIntosh, 1885

Type species
- Eulagisca corrientis McIntosh, 1885

= Eulagisca =

Genus of annelids

Eulagisca is a genus of marine polychaete worms belonging to the family Polynoidae. The genus includes 5 species which are all found in the Southern and Antarctic Oceans and are notable for reaching a large size, 180 mm or more long, larger than any other species of Polynoidae.

== Description ==
Species of Eulagisca have 35–41 segments and 15 pairs of elytra. The lateral antennae are undivided and inserted terminally on the prostomium. There is a distinctive dorsal fold ("nuchal flap" in the taxonomic literature) on segment 2, and unlike the related genus Pareulagisca, in Eulagisca all notochaetae are stout and have blunt tips.

== Species ==
Five species of Eulagisca are recognised as of August 2020:

- Eulagisca corrientis McIntosh, 1885
- Eulagisca gigantea Monro, 1939
- Eulagisca macnabi Pettibone, 1997
- Eulagisca puschkini Averincev, 1972
- Eulagisca uschakovi Pettibone, 1997
