= Edwardsina =

Scientific classification
- Domain: Eukaryota
- Kingdom: Animalia
- Phylum: Arthropoda
- Class: Insecta
- Order: Diptera
- Family: Blephariceridae
- Genus: Edwardsina; Meigen, 1803

Type species
- Edwardsina chilensis Alexander, 1920

Genus of flies

Edwardsina is a genus of flies in family Blephariceridae.

== Species ==
- Edwardsina chilensis Alexander, 1920
- Edwardsina fimbrata Zwick, 2006
- Edwardsina fuscipes Edwards, 1929
- Edwardsina gigantea Zwick, 1977
- Edwardsina imperatrix Alexander, 1962
- Edwardsina tasmaniensis Tonnoir, 1924
