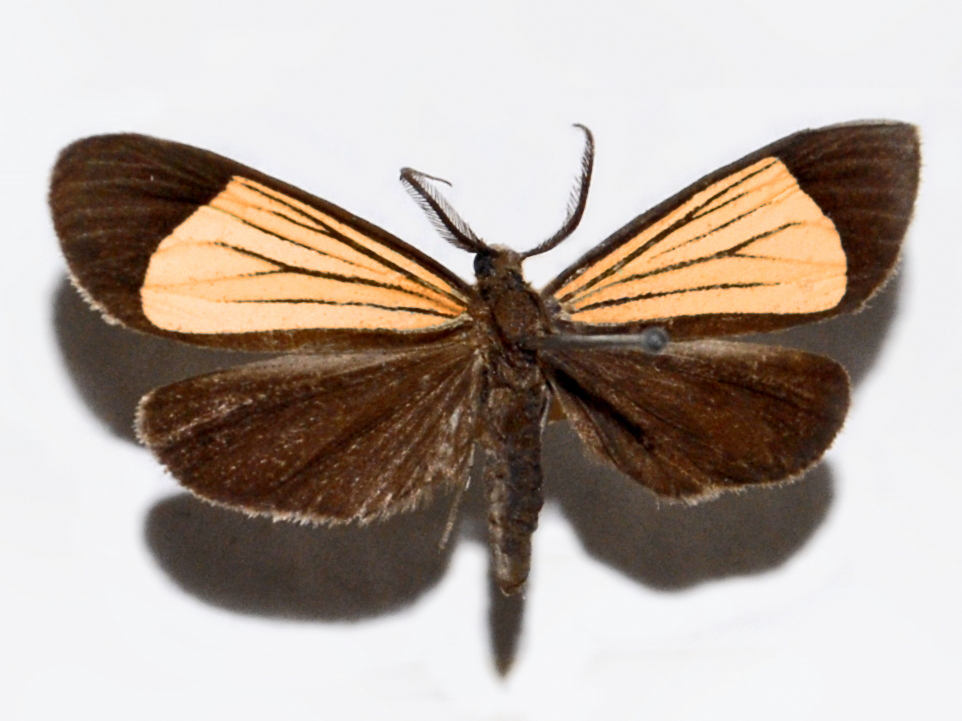
- Mounted Scea auriflamma

Scientific classification
- Kingdom: Animalia
- Phylum: Arthropoda
- Clade: Pancrustacea
- Class: Insecta
- Order: Lepidoptera
- Superfamily: Noctuoidea
- Family: Notodontidae
- Subfamily: Dioptinae
- Tribe: Josiini
- Genus: Scea; Walker, 1854

Synonyms
- Thirmida Walker, 1854; Cyanotricha Prout, 1918

= Scea =

Genus of moths

Scea is a genus of moths of the family Notodontidae.

== Species ==
This genus consists of the following species:

- Scea angustimargo Warren, 1905
- Scea auriflamma (Geyer, [1827])
- Scea bellona (Druce, 1906)
- Scea bryki Hering, 1943
- Scea circumscripta (Hering, 1925)
- Scea cleonica Druce, 1885
- Scea curvilimes Prout, 1918
- Scea dimidiata (Walker, 1854)
- Scea discinota (Warren, 1900)
- Scea erasa Prout, 1918
- Scea gigantea (Druce, 1896)
- Scea grandis (Druce, 1900)
- Scea necyria (C. Felder, R. Felder & Rogenhofer, 1875)
- Scea semifulva Warren, 1904
- Scea servula Warren, 1901
- Scea steinbachi Prout, 1918
- Scea subcyanea Prout, 1918
- Scea superba (Druce, 1890)
- Scea torrida Miller, 2008
- Scea venusta (Dognin, 1900)
