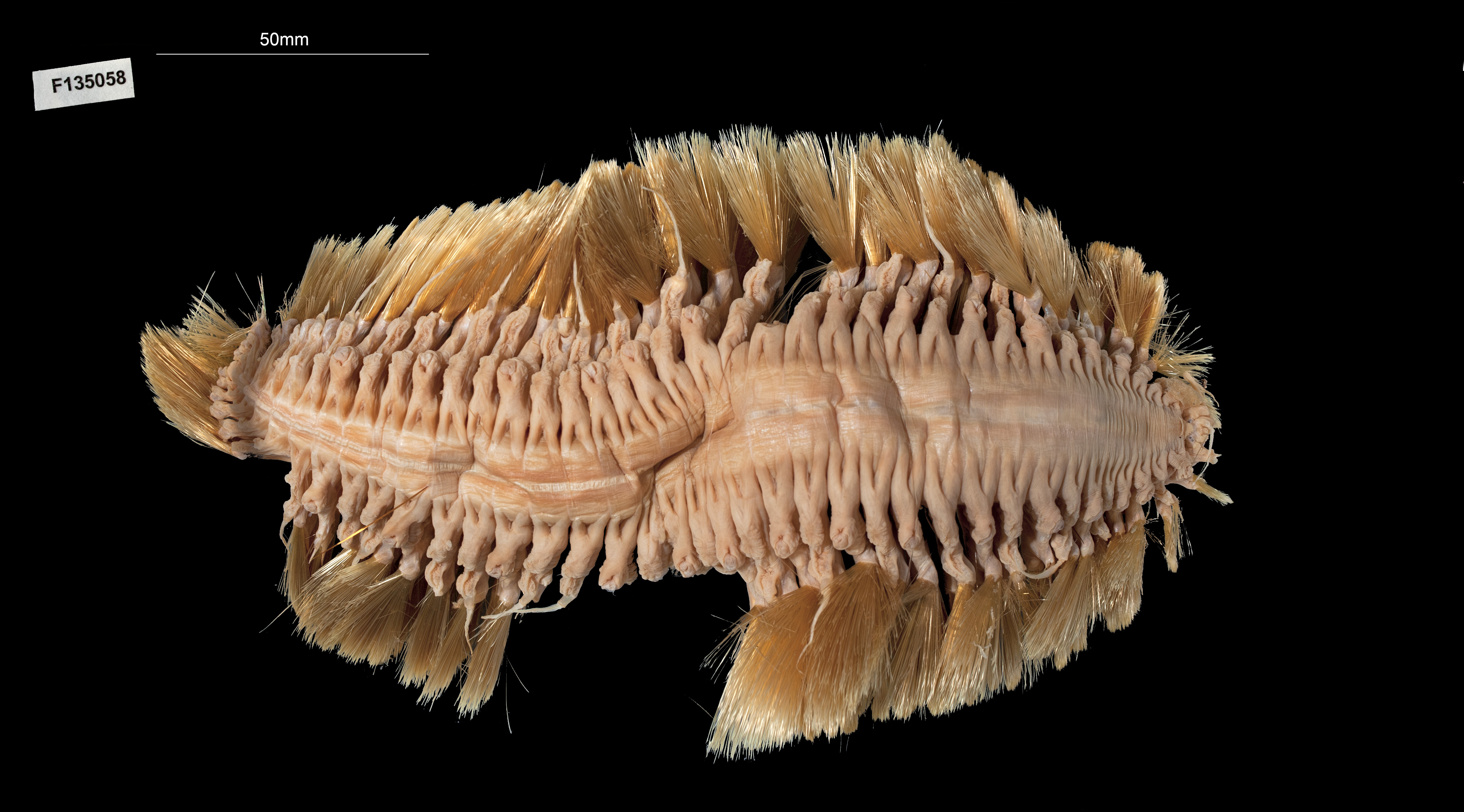
- Dorsal view of a Eulagisca uschakovi specimen from Museums Victoria

Scientific classification
- Kingdom: Animalia
- Phylum: Annelida
- Clade: Pleistoannelida
- Subclass: Errantia
- Order: Phyllodocida
- Family: Polynoidae
- Genus: Eulagisca
- Species: E. uschakovi

Binomial name
- Eulagisca uschakovi Pettibone, 1997

= Eulagisca uschakovi =

Species of annelid worm

Eulagisca uschakovi is a giant scale worm known from the Antarctic, in waters such as off Mac.Robertson Land, Palmer Archipelago and the Weddell Sea, at depths of 10 to 920m.

== Description ==
Specimens can grow to up to around 190 mm in length and have 39 segments with 15 pairs of elytra. The body is brownish at the mid-dorsum. The elytra are large and thin, with brownish splashes of pigmentation and fringe of sharp, pointed papillae along their margin. Wide, ovular prostomium with the median antenna with a large ceratophore in an anterior notch and lateral antennae inserted terminally on anterior margin of prostomium. Notochaetae are capillary-type and thicker than the capillary neurochaetae.
