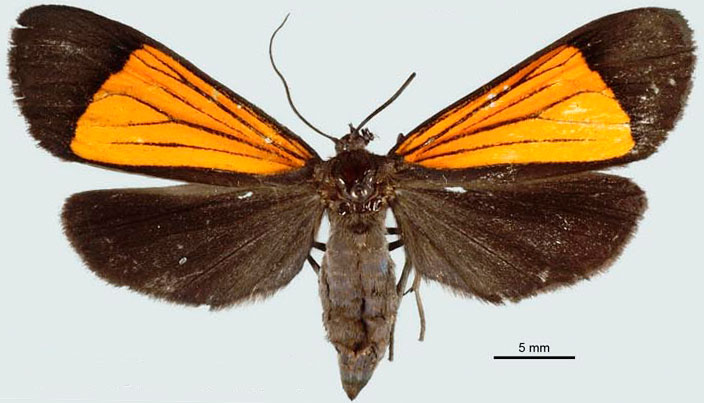

Scientific classification
- Kingdom: Animalia
- Phylum: Arthropoda
- Clade: Pancrustacea
- Class: Insecta
- Order: Lepidoptera
- Superfamily: Noctuoidea
- Family: Notodontidae
- Genus: Scea
- Species: S. steinbachi

Binomial name
- Scea steinbachi Prout, 1918

= Scea steinbachi =

Species of moth

Scea steinbachi is a moth of the family Notodontidae. It is found in South America, including and possibly limited to Argentina.
