= Edwardsina tasmaniensis =

Conservation status
- Vulnerable (IUCN 3.1)

Scientific classification
- Kingdom: Animalia
- Phylum: Arthropoda
- Clade: Pancrustacea
- Class: Insecta
- Order: Diptera
- Family: Blephariceridae
- Genus: Edwardsina
- Species: E. tasmaniensis

Binomial name
- Edwardsina tasmaniensis Tonnoir, 1924

Species of fly

Edwardsina tasmaniensis, the Tasmanian torrent midge, is a species of fly in family Blephariceridae. It is endemic to Australia. As the name suggests, they make their homes in the fastest-flowing parts of rivers and streams of Tasmania.
