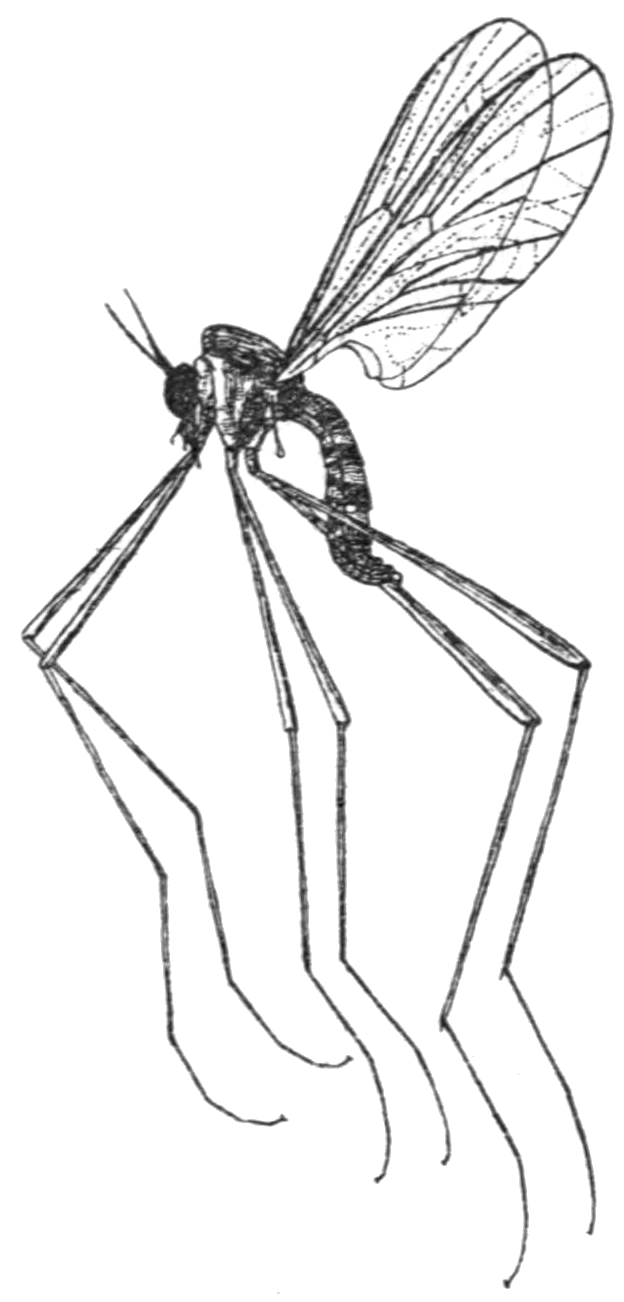
- Blepharicera fasciata

Scientific classification
- Kingdom: Animalia
- Phylum: Arthropoda
- Clade: Pancrustacea
- Class: Insecta
- Order: Diptera
- Infraorder: Psychodomorpha
- Family: Blephariceridae; Loew, 1862

Subfamilies
- Blepharicerinae; Edwardsininae

= Blephariceridae =

Blephariceridae Temporal range: Middle Jurassic–Present

Family of flies

The Blephariceridae, commonly known as net-winged midges, are a nematoceran family in the order Diptera. The adults resemble crane flies except with a projecting anal angle in the wings, and different head shape, absence of the V on the mesonotum, and more laterally outstretched, forward-facing legs. They are uncommon, but dozens of genera occur worldwide, and over 400 species.

One recent classification based largely on fossils treats this family as the sole member of its infraorder, but this has not gained wide acceptance.

== Selected genera and species ==
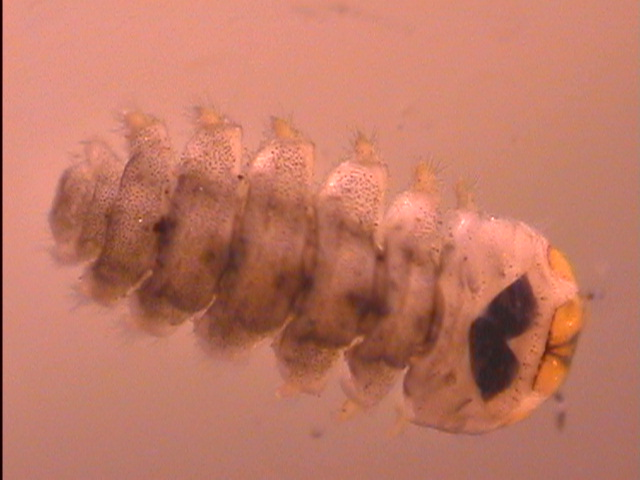
Larva of Blepharicera

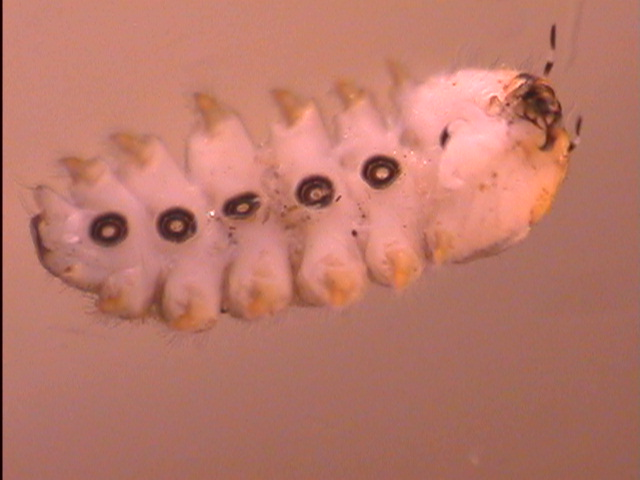
Larva of Blepharicera, ventral

- Subfamily Blepharicerinae
  - Tribe Blepharicerini
    - Agathon Rodor, 1890
      - Agathon arizonica (Alexander, 1958)
      - Agathon aylmeri (Garrett, 1923)
      - Agathon comstocki (Kellogg, 1903)
      - Agathon dismalea (Hogue, 1970)
      - Agathon doanei (Kellogg, 1900)
      - Agathon elegantulus Roder, 1890
      - Agathon markii (Garrett, 1925)
      - Agathon sequoiarum (Alexander, 1952)
    - Bibiocephala
      - Bibiocephala grandis Osten Sacken, 1874
    - Blepharicera Macquart, 1843
      - Blepharicera appalachiae Hogue and Georgian, 1986
      - Blepharicera capitata (Loew, 1863)
      - Blepharicera cherokea Hogue, 1978
      - Blepharicera coweetae Hogue and Georgian, 1985
      - Blepharicera diminutiva Hogue, 1978
      - Blepharicera jordani (Kellogg, 1903)
      - Blepharicera micheneri (Alexander, 1959)
      - Blepharicera ostensackeni Kellogg, 1903
      - Blepharicera similans (Johannsen, 1929)
      - Blepharicera tenuipes (Walker, 1848)
      - Blepharicera williamsae (Alexander, 1953)
      - Blepharicera zionensis (Alexander, 1953)
    - Philorus
      - Philorus californicus Hogue, 1966
      - Philorus jacinto Hogue, 1966
      - Philorus vanduzeei Alexander, 1963
      - Philorus yosemite (Osten Sacken, 1877)
- Subfamily Edwardsininae
  - Edwardsina
    - Edwardsina gigantea Zwick, 1977
    - Edwardsina tasmaniensis Tonnoir, 1924
  - Paulianina

== Extinct genera ==
- †Blephadejura Lukashevich et al. 2006 Daohugou, China, Callovian
- †Brianina Zhang and Lukashevich 2007 Daohugou, China, Callovian
- †Megathon Lukashevich and Shcherbakov 1997 Daohugou, China, Callovian, Ola Formation, Russia, Campanian
- †Philorites Cockerell 1908 Green River Formation, Colorado, Eocene
- †Sinotendipes Hong and Wang 1990 Laiyang Formation, China, Aptian

== Larval development ==
The pupae are ovoid and remain firmly attached to rocks that are regularly washed or splashed by water, using paired adhesion disks rather than the more typical suction disks. Upon emergence, adults resemble delicate craneflies, possessing elongated antennae and wings marked by a distinctive network of fissures and folds, somewhat evocative of broken safety glass.

Adult net-winged midges often suspend themselves from vegetation similar to scorpion flies or cling to moist rock faces near the streams and rivers inhabited by their larvae. They obtain food by scraping diatoms and other microorganisms from surfaces. In numerous lineages, females exhibit predatory behaviour, seizing mayflies and other small insects with specialized hind tarsi.
