= Eulagisca macnabi =

Scientific classification
- Kingdom: Animalia
- Phylum: Annelida
- Clade: Pleistoannelida
- Subclass: Errantia
- Order: Phyllodocida
- Family: Polynoidae
- Genus: Eulagisca
- Species: E. macnabi

Binomial name
- Eulagisca macnabi Pettibone, 1997

Species of annelid

Eulagisca macnabi is a scale worm that occurs in the Antarctic Ocean, the Amundsen Sea and off the South Orkney Islands at depths of about 300 to 1500m.

== Description ==
Eulagisa macnabi most likely has 15 pairs of elytra that have a marginal fringe of papillae. It is brown-pigmented, especially on bases of parapodia and elytrophores. Lateral antennae are inserted terminally on anterior margin of prostomium. The notochaetae are distinctly thicker than the neurochaetae, but bidentate neurochaetae are absent.
