= Thermidarctia =

Scientific classification
- Domain: Eukaryota
- Kingdom: Animalia
- Phylum: Arthropoda
- Class: Insecta
- Order: Lepidoptera
- Superfamily: Noctuoidea
- Family: Erebidae
- Subfamily: Arctiinae
- Subtribe: Pericopina
- Genus: Thermidarctia; Talbot, 1929

Genus of moths

Thermidarctia is a genus of moths in the subfamily Arctiinae.

== Species ==
- Thermidarctia thermidoides Talbot, 1929
- Thermidarctia thirmida Hering, 1926
