= P. gigantea =

P. gigantea may refer to:

- Pachyaena gigantea, an extinct mammal species in the genus Pachyaena
- Panthea gigantea, a moth species found in western North America
- Petalura gigantea, the giant dragonfly or south-eastern petaltail, one of the world's largest dragonflies
- Phalaenopsis gigantea, an orchid species endemic to Borneo
- Pinguicula gigantea, a tropical carnivorous plant species native to Mexico
- Pleuroploca gigantea (= Triplofusus papillosus), the Florida horse conch, a species of extremely large predatory subtropical and tropical sea snail
- Pouteria gigantea, a plant species endemic to Ecuador
- Pseudaneitea gigantea, an air-breathing land slug species
- Pseudibis gigantea, the giant ibis, a bird species
- Pseudoeurycea gigantea, a salamander species endemic to Mexico

== See also ==
- Gigantea (disambiguation)
