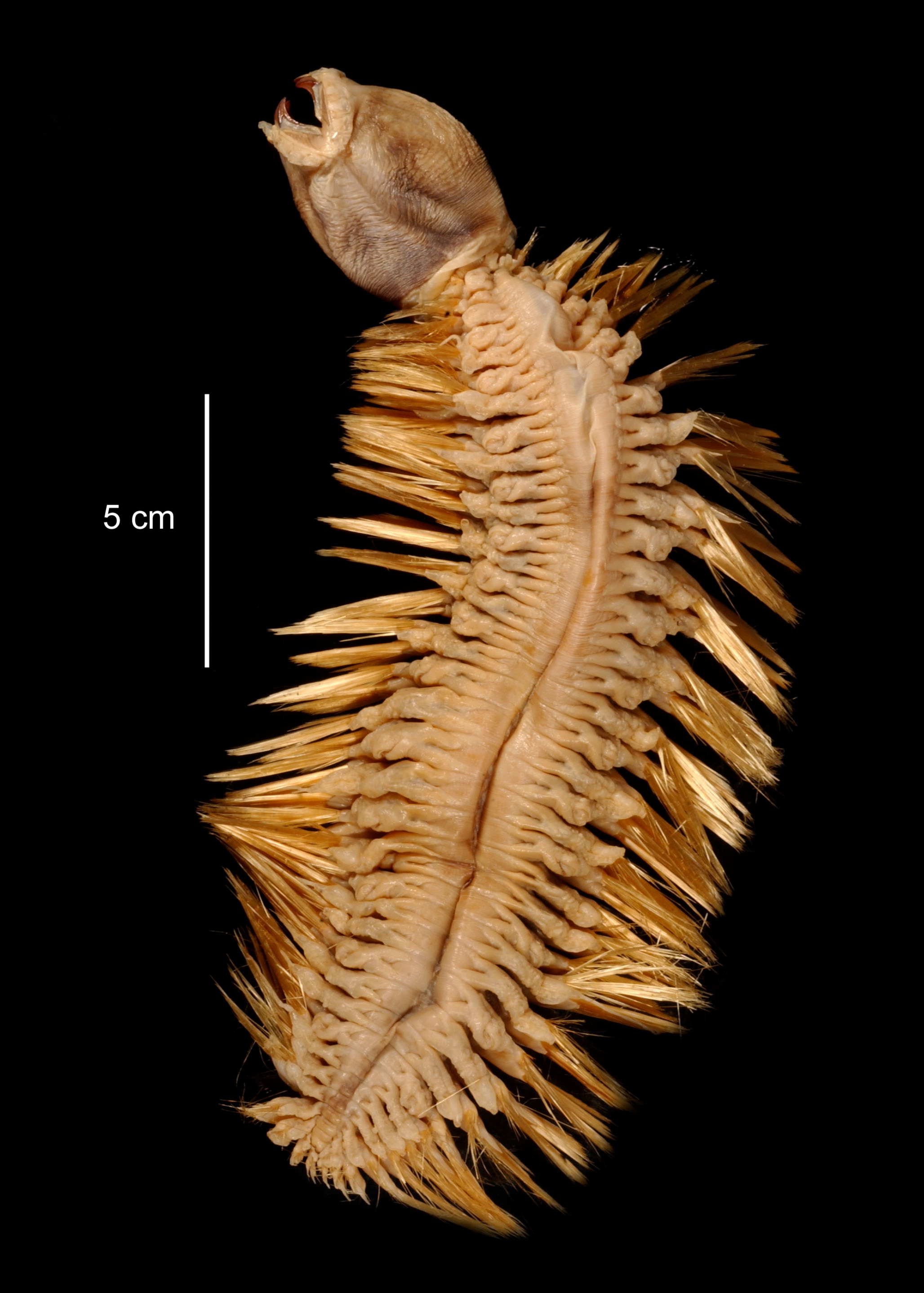

Scientific classification
- Kingdom: Animalia
- Phylum: Annelida
- Clade: Pleistoannelida
- Subclass: Errantia
- Order: Phyllodocida
- Family: Polynoidae
- Genus: Eulagisca
- Species: E. gigantea

Binomial name
- Eulagisca gigantea Monro, 1939

= Eulagisca gigantea =

Species of annelid worm

Eulagisca gigantea is a species of scale worm commonly known as the Antarctic scale worm. This species is specifically found in the deep sea in cold waters like the Antarctic Ocean. The scale worms are named for the elytra on their surface that look like scales.

== Description ==
The scale worms are believed to be descendants of a different species that entered the deep sea millions of years ago. The species then diverged to occupy different habitats including chemosynthesis-based habitats across the five oceans.

== Ecology ==
The Polynoidae family has been found in intertidal waters to the deep sea. They have also been found in chemosynthesis-based habitats, like hydrothermal vents, anchialine caves, cold seeps, and more. To survive in these extreme habitats, some species of scale worms have morphological and molecular adaptations. Some deep-sea Polynoidae members are known to live in association with megafauna like black coral. Other species are also shown to have a symbiotic relationship with a carnivorous sponge.

== Evolution ==
Polynoidae is a monophyletic group and within it, there are paraphyletic groups. The family Polynoidae is the most species-rich family of the scale worms, and contains species with peculiar characteristics that range from bioluminescence to transparency. The bioluminescence comes from the enzyme polynoidin that is within the scales of the worm. This family has around 900 species in it. Within the genus Eulagisca there are 5 different species known: Eulagisca corrientis, Eulagisca macnabi, Eulagisca puschkini, Eulagisca uschakovi, and Eulagisca gigantea.

== Physiology ==
Eulagisca gigantea is one of the largest scale worms getting up to 20 centimetres (7.9 in) in size. The scale worms are characterized by their body segment amount. They can get up to 40 segments with around 15 pairs of elytra on each segment. Their bodies are large and flattened. The elytra are the scales that are attached to the segments. The scale arrangement is an important character in identifying the species of scale worm. Most scales are oriented in an alternating overlapping pattern. Eulagisca gigantea is seen to have cream color scales with the parapodia being a golden brown. This golden-colored parapodia is how the Eulagisca gigantea is able to be distinguished from other Eulagisca and scale worms. On the prostomium, there are three antennae used for mechanosensory. They also have two pairs of eyes. The eyes appear dorsally on the head portion and are sessile. On the posterior margin of the prostomium is a nuchal organ with cilia bands on it. The retractable proboscis consists of a pair of large jaws used for grasping prey while hunting.

They have a thick muscular pharynx used to help digest their prey. They need this muscular pharynx to help break down the prey since they are predatory. There are also some species that feed on bacterial mats.

While scale worms are benthic and spend most of their time on the floor of the ocean, they are also able to swim. When the scale worms stop swimming, they mostly sink to the floor of the ocean while some others may remain suspended in the water column. They are able to swim, but the length of their cirri and body are critical to the time they are able to swim. If they were a bigger scale worm, they would struggle to swim for longer times. They swim by the antagonistic contraction of the longitudinal body muscles and the movement of parapodia. The movement of the parapodium has two different strokes, the power stroke and the recovery stroke. The power strokes are thrusts that gain movement directed from head to tail while the recovery strokes are movements directed from tail to head.

Eulagisca gigantea most likely uses a similar respiratory, circulatory, nervous, and digestive system as most marine Annelids. E. gigantea will likely use gills for respiration as seen in other marine Annelids. In Annelids, closed circulatory systems with the blood pumped through the blood vessels by muscle contraction can be seen. The nervous system of E. gigantea is likely a centralized cerebral ganglion in the prostomium with a ladder of nerves through the rest of the body.

== Development ==
Like most annelids, the family Polynoidae goes through indirect development with a trochophore larva. The larva of the Polynoidae differs from regular trochophore larvae because it lacks the metatroch and food groove. After the larvae have undergone metamorphosis, the juvenile scale worms start using their proboscis with jaws to feed.

== Reproduction ==
Most scale worms are known to have different sexes seen through different number of nephridial papillae. While they do have separate sexes, sometimes hermaphroditism does occur. The structures within the worm show the capability of both internal and external fertilization.
