= Callindra arginalis =

Scientific classification
- Kingdom: Animalia
- Phylum: Arthropoda
- Class: Insecta
- Order: Lepidoptera
- Superfamily: Noctuoidea
- Family: Erebidae
- Subfamily: Arctiinae
- Genus: Callindra
- Species: C. arginalis

Binomial name
- Callindra arginalis (Hampson, 1894)

Synonyms
- Areas arginalis Hampson, 1894; Callindra gigantea Röber, 1925

Species of moth

Callindra arginalis is a moth in the family Erebidae first described by George Hampson in 1894. It is found in eastern India and Guangxi and Yunnan in China.
