= Wittrockia gigantea =

Scientific classification
- Kingdom: Plantae
- Clade: Tracheophytes
- Clade: Angiosperms
- Clade: Monocots
- Clade: Commelinids
- Order: Poales
- Family: Bromeliaceae
- Genus: Wittrockia
- Species: W. gigantea

Binomial name
- Wittrockia gigantea (Baker) Leme

Species of flowering plant

Wittrockia gigantea is a plant species in the genus Wittrockia.

The bromeliad is endemic to the Atlantic Forest biome (Mata Atlantica Brasileira), located in southeastern Brazil. It is native within Minas Gerais, Rio de Janeiro (state), and São Paulo (state).

== Cultivars and hybrids ==
Cultivars and hybrids include:

- Wittrockia 'Leopardinum'
- Neorockia 'Midhurst'
