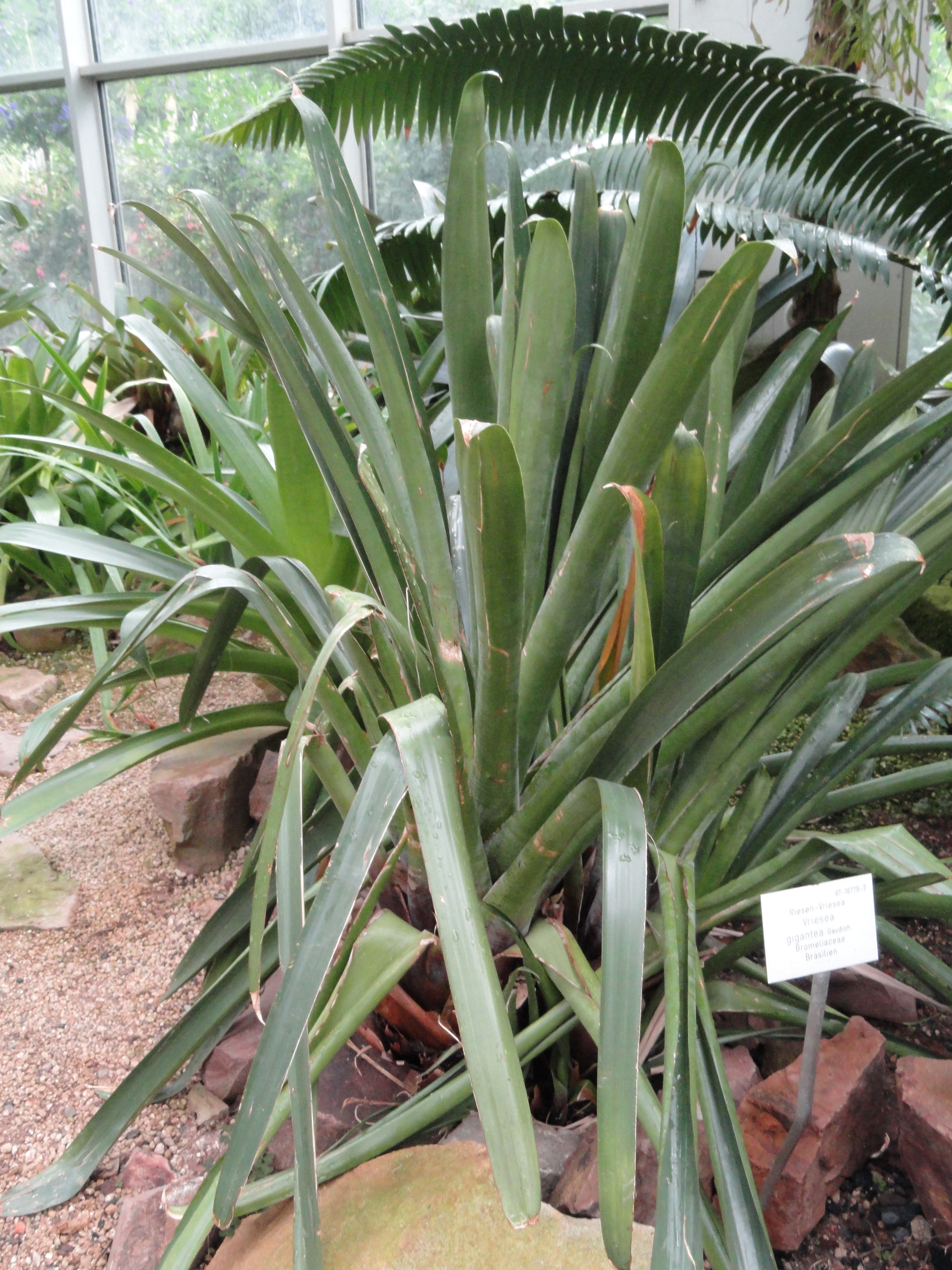

Scientific classification
- Kingdom: Plantae
- Clade: Tracheophytes
- Clade: Angiosperms
- Clade: Monocots
- Clade: Commelinids
- Order: Poales
- Family: Bromeliaceae
- Genus: Vriesea
- Species: V. gigantea

Binomial name
- Vriesea gigantea Gaudichaud

= Vriesea gigantea =

Species of flowering plant

Vriesea gigantea is a plant species in the genus Vriesea. This species is endemic to Brazil.

== Cultivars ==
- Vriesea 'Casper'
- Vriesea 'Daintree Forest'
- Vriesea 'Debra Jones'
- Vriesea 'Elfi'
- Vriesea 'Goblin'
- Vriesea 'Green Jade'
- Vriesea 'Jolly Green Giant'
- Vriesea 'Lavender Lady'
- Vriesea 'Lemon Lime & Bitters'
- Vriesea 'Majestic Beauty'
- Vriesea 'Mortfontanensis'
- Vriesea 'Painted Canyon'
- Vriesea 'Roberto Kautsky'
- Vriesea 'Robusta'
- Vriesea 'San Miguel'
- Vriesea 'Snow In Summer'
- Vriesea 'Snowman'
- Vriesea 'The Daintree'
- Vriesea 'Wyee Point'
- Vriesea 'Zapita'
