= Thermidarctia thermidoides =

Scientific classification
- Kingdom: Animalia
- Phylum: Arthropoda
- Clade: Pancrustacea
- Class: Insecta
- Order: Lepidoptera
- Superfamily: Noctuoidea
- Family: Erebidae
- Subfamily: Arctiinae
- Genus: Thermidarctia
- Species: T. thermidoides

Binomial name
- Thermidarctia thermidoides Talbot, 1929

Species of moth

Thermidarctia thermidoides is a moth in the subfamily Arctiinae. It was described by George Talbot in 1929. It is found in Venezuela.
