= Edwardsina gigantea =

Conservation status
- Endangered (IUCN 3.1)

Scientific classification
- Kingdom: Animalia
- Phylum: Arthropoda
- Clade: Pancrustacea
- Class: Insecta
- Order: Diptera
- Family: Blephariceridae
- Genus: Edwardsina
- Species: E. gigantea

Binomial name
- Edwardsina gigantea Zwick, 1977

Species of fly

Edwardsina gigantea, the giant torrent midge, is a species of fly in family Blephariceridae. It is endemic to Australia.
