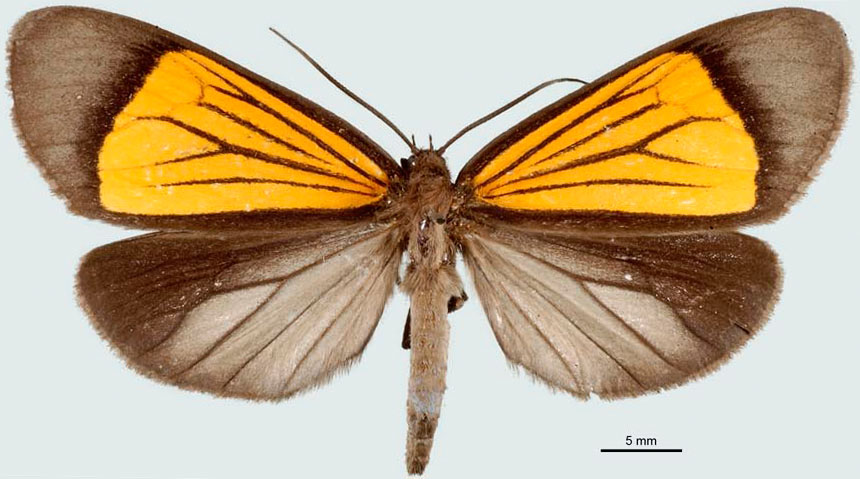

Scientific classification
- Kingdom: Animalia
- Phylum: Arthropoda
- Clade: Pancrustacea
- Class: Insecta
- Order: Lepidoptera
- Superfamily: Noctuoidea
- Family: Notodontidae
- Genus: Scea
- Species: S. gigantea

Binomial name
- Scea gigantea (Druce, 1896)

Synonyms
- Thirmida gigantea Druce, 1896

= Scea gigantea =

Species of moth

Scea gigantea is a moth of the family Notodontidae which lives in South America, possibly only Bolivia.
