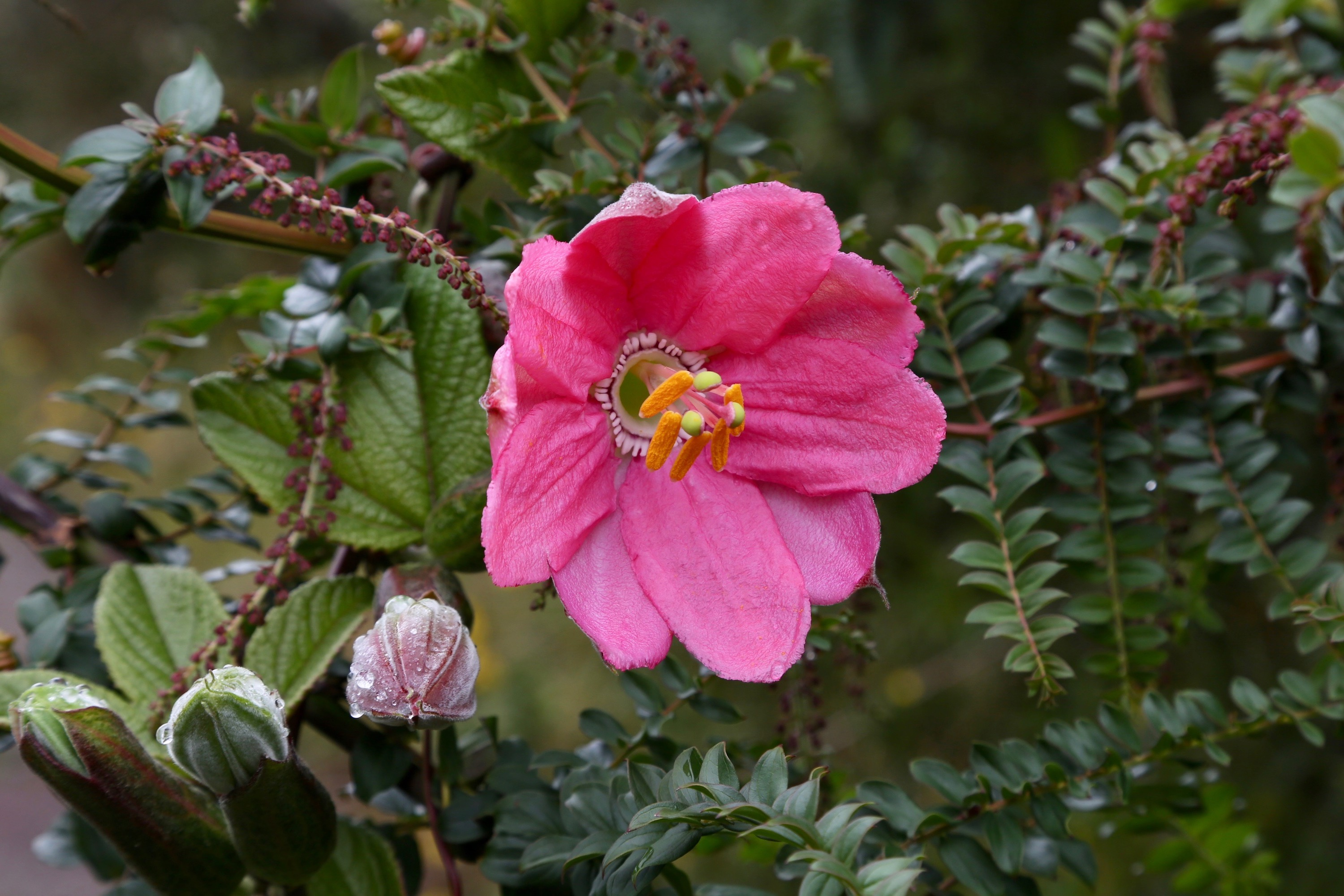
- Passiflora mixta

Scientific classification
- Kingdom: Plantae
- Clade: Tracheophytes
- Clade: Angiosperms
- Clade: Eudicots
- Clade: Rosids
- Order: Malpighiales
- Family: Passifloraceae
- Genus: Passiflora
- Supersection: Passiflora supersect. Tacsonia (Juss.) Feuillet & J.M.MacDougal (2003)

Type species
- Passiflora mixta Lam.

Species
- See text

Synonyms
- Poggendorffia H.Karst.; Tacsonia Juss.

= Banana passionfruit =

Species of plant

Banana passionfruit (Passiflora supersect. Tacsonia), also known as taxo in Ecuador and curuba in Colombia, is a group of around 64 Passiflora species found in South America. Most species in this section are found in high-elevation cloud forest habitats. Flowers have a cylindrical hypanthium.

== Species ==
Section	Series	Image	Scientific name	Distribution
Bolivianae			Passiflora gracilens	Bolivia (Cochabamba and La Paz), Peru (Apurimac, Cajamarca, Cusco, Huancavelica, Huánuco, Junín, and La Libertad)
Rathea			Passiflora andina	
Rathea			Passiflora colombiana	
Rathea			Passiflora harlingii	
Rathea			Passiflora unipetala	
Insignes			Passiflora carrascoensis	
Insignes			Passiflora insignis	
Insignes			Passiflora lanceolata	
Insignes			Passiflora mandonii	
Insignes			Passiflora pilosicorona	
Insignes			Passiflora pinnatistipula	
Tasconiopsis			Passiflora bracteosa	
Tasconiopsis			Passiflora purdiei	
Trifoliata			Passiflora trifoliata	
Trifoliata			Passiflora huamachucoensis	
Fimbriatistipula			Passiflora fimbriatistipula	Colombia (Huila and Cauca)
Fimbriatistipula			Passiflora uribei	Colombia (Putumayo)
Manicata			Passiflora manicata	
Manicata			Passiflora macropoda	
Manicata			Passiflora trisecta	
Manicata			Passiflora peduncularis	
Manicata			Passiflora weberbaueri	
Parritana			Passiflora parritae	Colombia (Caldas, Tolima, and Risaralda)
Parritana			Passiflora jardinensis	Colombia (Jardín in Antioquia)
Tacsonia			Passiflora amazonica	
Tacsonia			Passiflora mixta	
Tacsonia			Passiflora matthewsii	
Tacsonia			Passiflora schlimiana	
Tacsonia			Passiflora salpoense	
Colombiana	Quindiensae		Passiflora linearistipula	
Colombiana	Quindiensae		Passiflora quindiensis	
Colombiana	Leptomischae		Passiflora ampullacea	
Colombiana	Leptomischae		Passiflora antioquiensis	
Colombiana	Leptomischae		Passiflora coactilis	
Colombiana	Leptomischae		Passiflora cremastantha	
Colombiana	Leptomischae		Passiflora flexipes	
Colombiana	Leptomischae		Passiflora leptomischa	
Colombiana	Leptomischae		Passiflora tenerifensis	
Colombiana	Colombianae		Passiflora adulterina	
Colombiana	Colombianae		Passiflora crispolanata	
Colombiana	Colombianae		Passiflora cuatrecasasii	
Colombiana	Colombianae		Passiflora formosa	
Colombiana	Colombianae		Passiflora lanata	
Colombiana	Colombianae		Passiflora pamplonensis	
Colombiana	Colombianae		Passiflora rugosa	
Colombiana	Colombianae		Passiflora trianae	
Colombiana	Colombianae		Passiflora truxillensis	
Elkhea			Passiflora anastomosans	
Elkhea			Passiflora brachyantha	
Elkhea			Passiflora cumbalensis	
Elkhea			Passiflora linearistipula	
Elkhea			Passiflora jamesonii	
Elkhea			Passiflora linda	
Elkhea			Passiflora loxensis	
Elkhea			Passiflora luzmarina	
Elkhea			Passiflora roseorum	
Elkhea			Passiflora sanctae-barbarae	
Elkhea			Passiflora tarminiana	
Elkhea			Passiflora tripartita	
Elkhea			Passiflora zamorana	Ecuador (Zamora-Chinchipe)

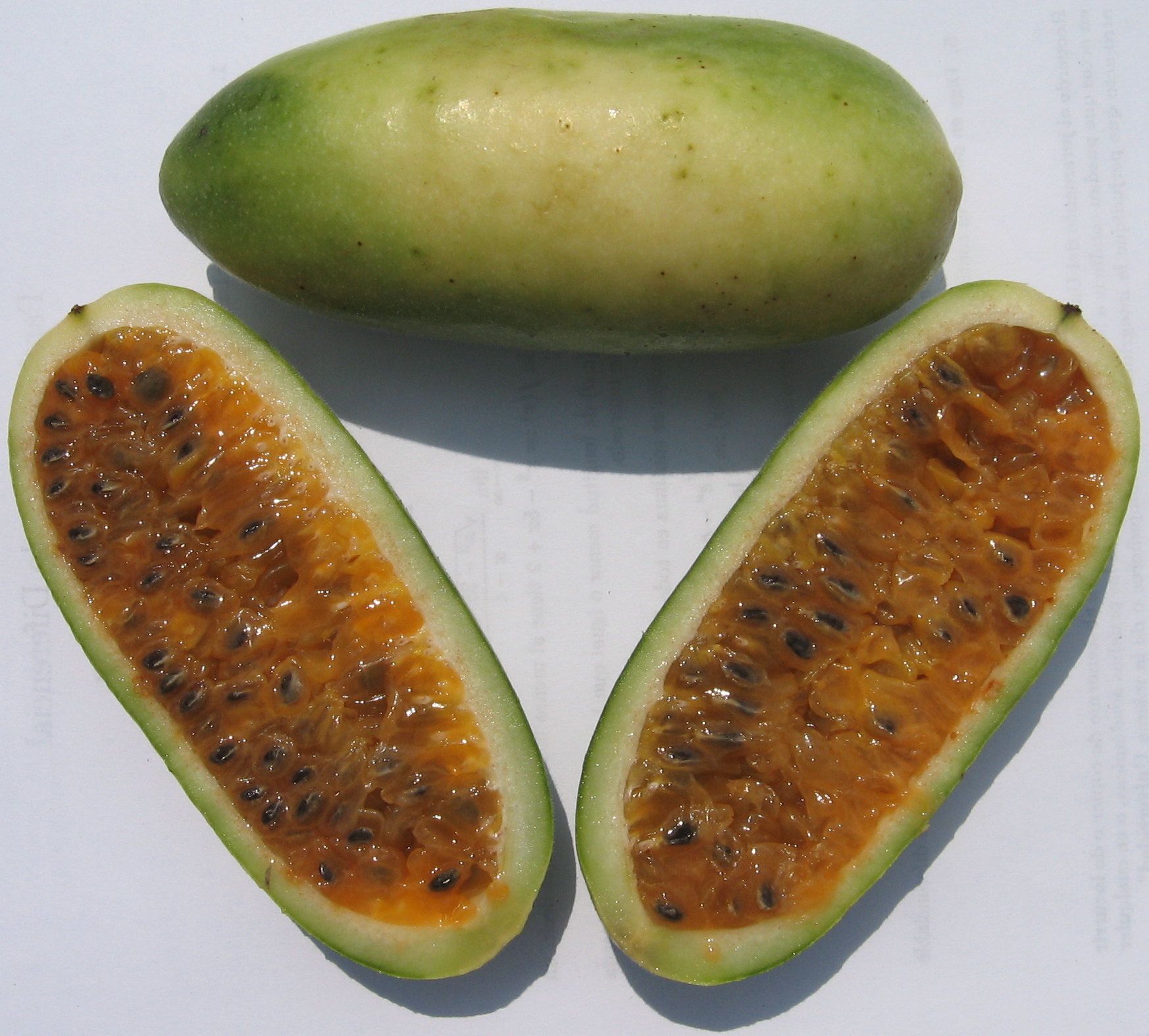
Whole and longitudinally-cut banana passionfruits.

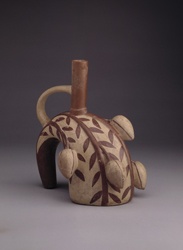
Banana passionfruit ceramic. Moche culture.

== Invasive species ==
P. tarminiana and P. tripartita thrive in the climate of New Zealand. They are invasive species since they can smother forest margins and forest regrowth. It is illegal to sell, cultivate, or distribute the plants.

As of 2011, banana passionfruit vines are smothering more than 200 square miles (520 km^{2}) of native forest on the islands of Hawaii and Kauai. Seeds are spread by feral pigs, birds and humans. The vine can also be found all across the highlands of New Guinea and in Tasmania.
