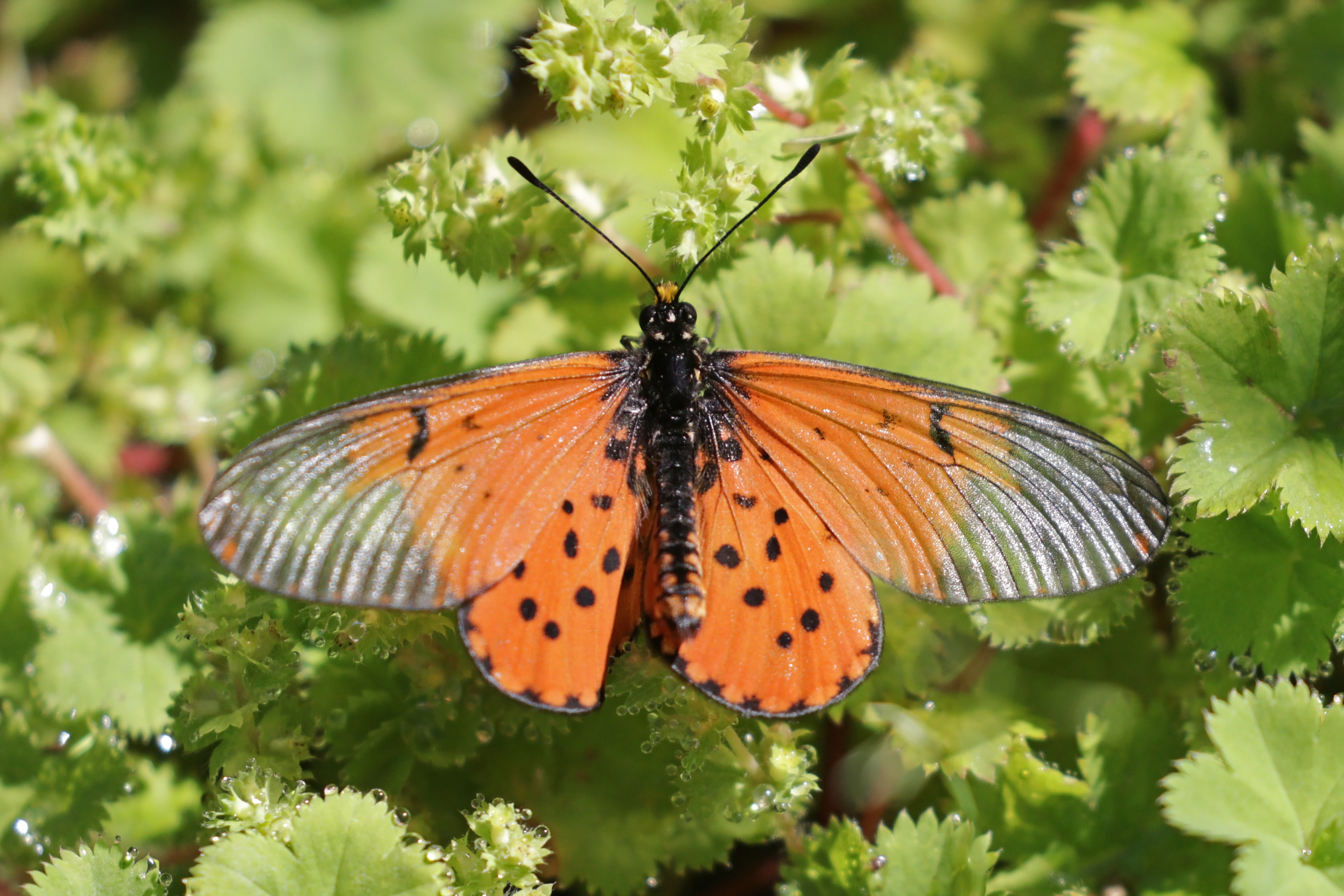

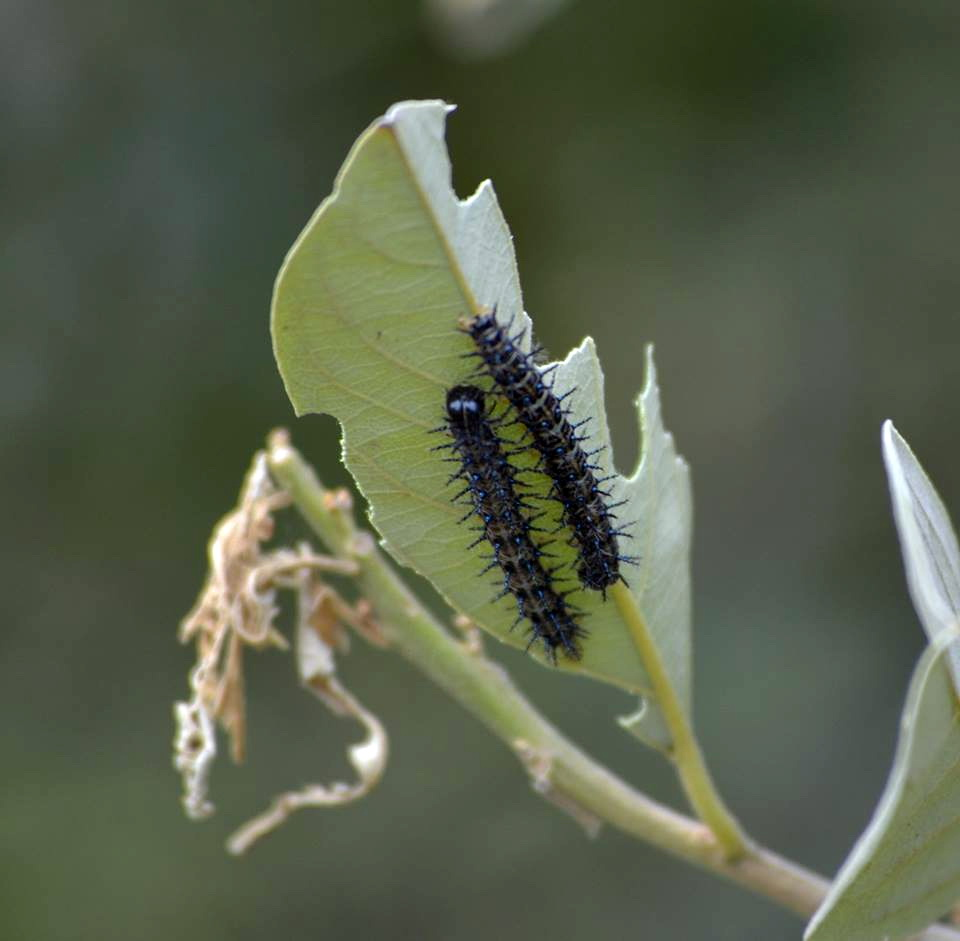
- Male imago (above) and the swarthy caterpillars on a Kiggelaria leaf

Conservation status
- Least Concern (IUCN 3.1)

Scientific classification
- Kingdom: Animalia
- Phylum: Arthropoda
- Class: Insecta
- Order: Lepidoptera
- Family: Nymphalidae
- Genus: Acraea
- Species: A. horta

Binomial name
- Acraea horta (Linnaeus, 1764)

Synonyms
- Papilio horta Linnaeus, 1764; Acraea horta ab. conjuncta Blachier, 1912

= Acraea horta =

Garden acraea

Species of butterfly

Acraea horta or the garden acraea is a butterfly of the family Nymphalidae. It is found in South Africa and Zimbabwe.

== Description ==
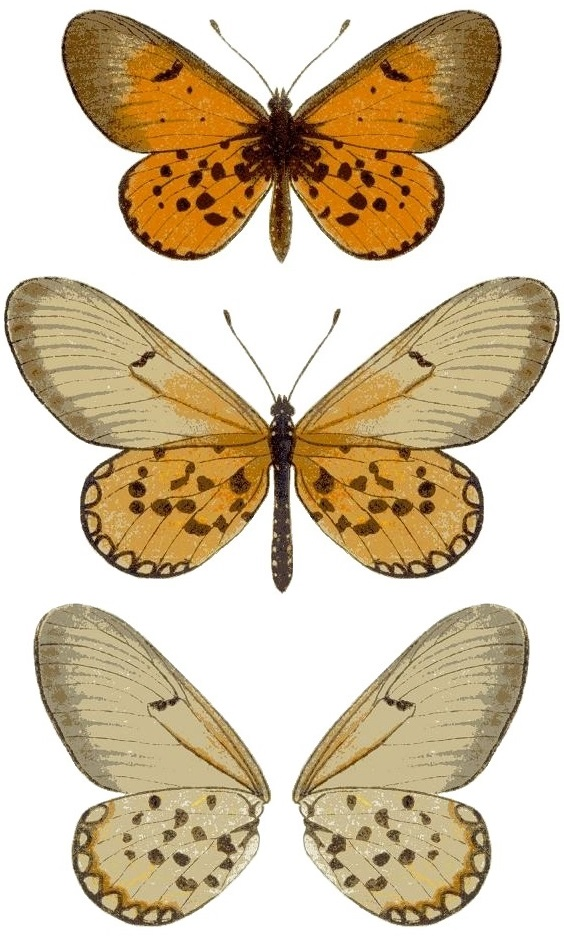
Acraea horta male, female and female's wing undersides in Seitz's Fauna Africana Taf. 53

A. horta L. (53 e, f) is one of the longest known and commonest Acraeids of the Cape, but it is also native to Pondoland, Natal, Zululand, Transvaal and Zimbabwe. It has a typical wingspan of 45–50 mm for males and 49–53 mm for females. The male is similar to that of neobule, but differs in having the black dots of the fore wing absent or only represented by a dot in the cell and another in 1b, the marginal spots of the hind wing small, elongate and incompletely separated from the ground-colour and the hindwing beneath red at the inner margin and the marginal band. In the female the forewing is almost entirely hyaline and the hindwing above light yellow to grey-yellow, beneath whitish with larger marginal spots, bounded by distinct lunules. The larva is brown-yellow with black transverse lines and yellow 7 lateral and dorsal lines, while the head and spines are black. The larva lives on Kiggelaria africana and various Passiflora species.

- female ab. conjuncta Blachier is distinguished by having the discal dots of the hindwing changed into long, broad black stripes.

== Biology ==
Adults are on wing year-round, but are more common from October to April.

The larvae feed on Kiggelaria africana, Passiflora (including Passiflora coerulea, Passiflora manicata and Passiflora mollisima), and Tacsonia species.

== Taxonomy ==
It is a member of the Acraea terpsicore species group - but see also Pierre & Bernaud, 2014

== Gallery ==
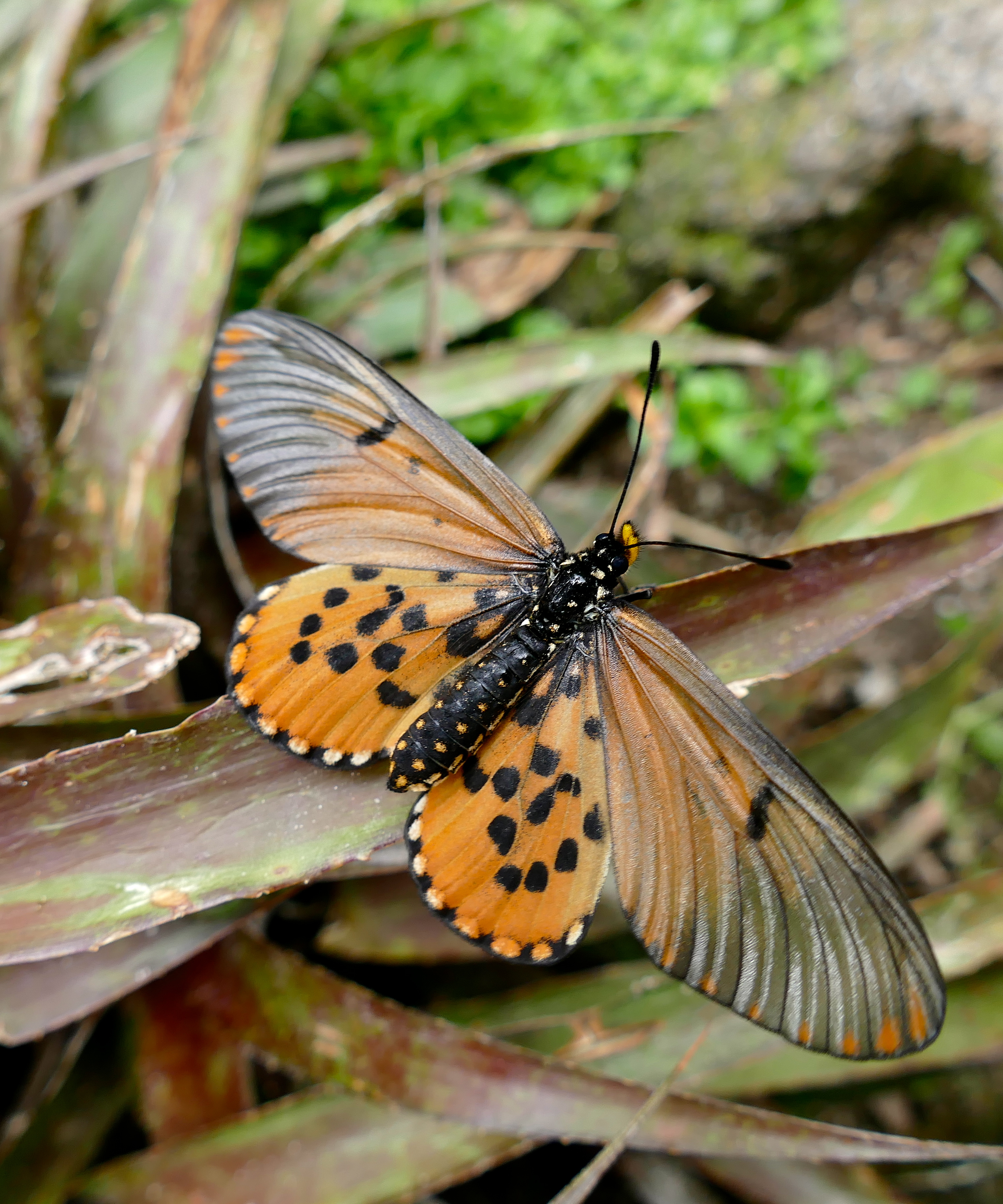
The female imago

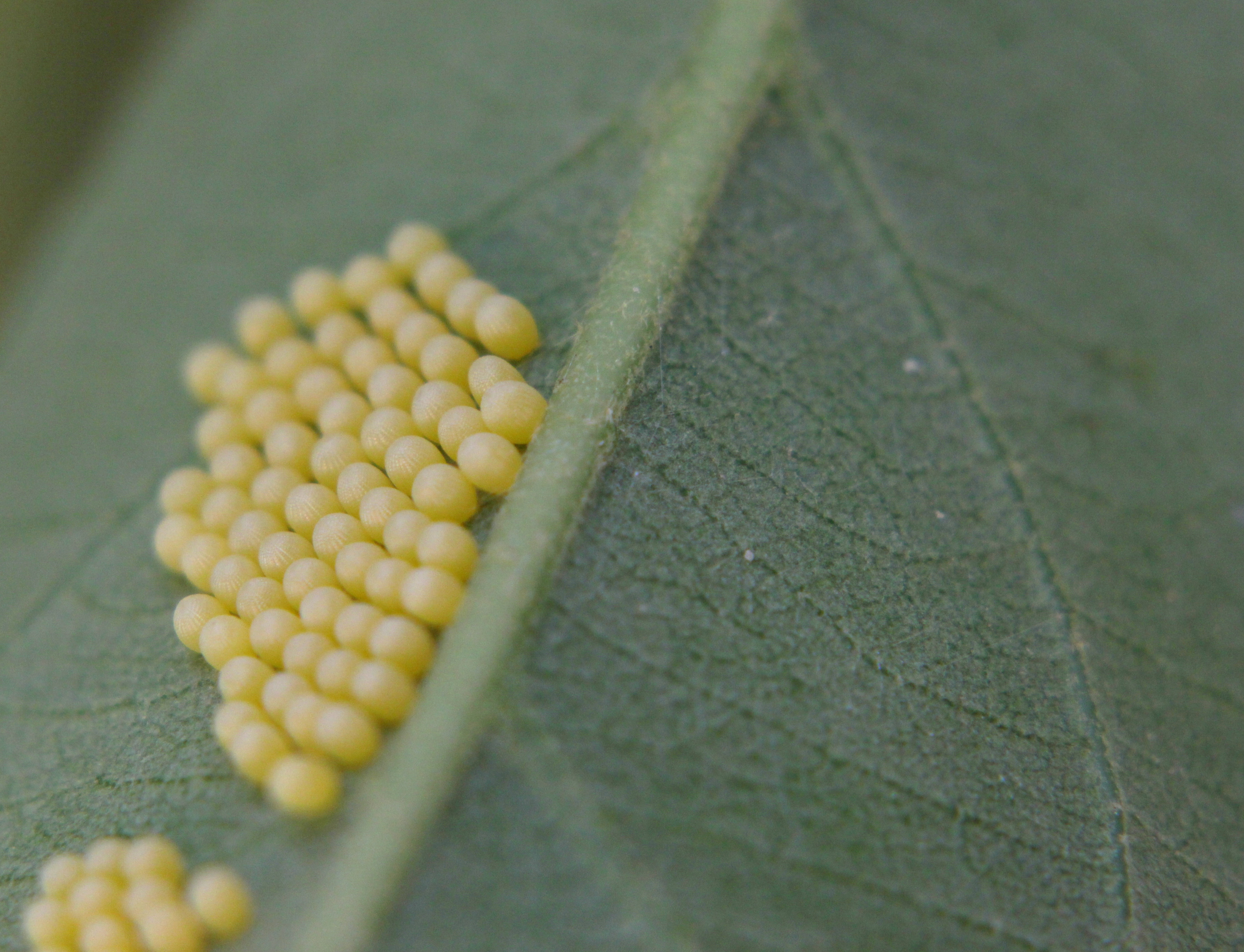
Eggs on underside of Kiggelaria africana leaf

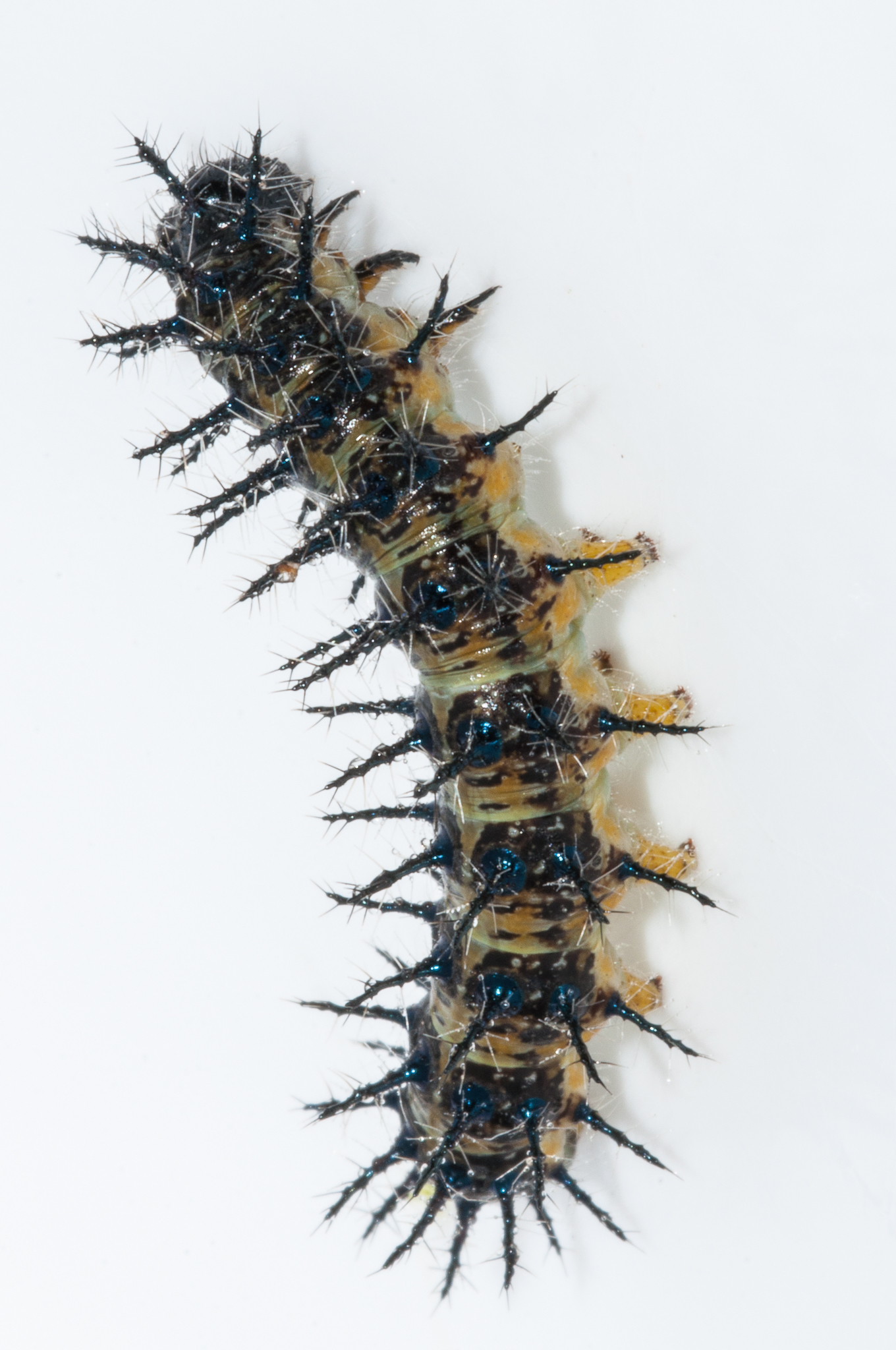
Dorsal view of larva, showing barbed spines

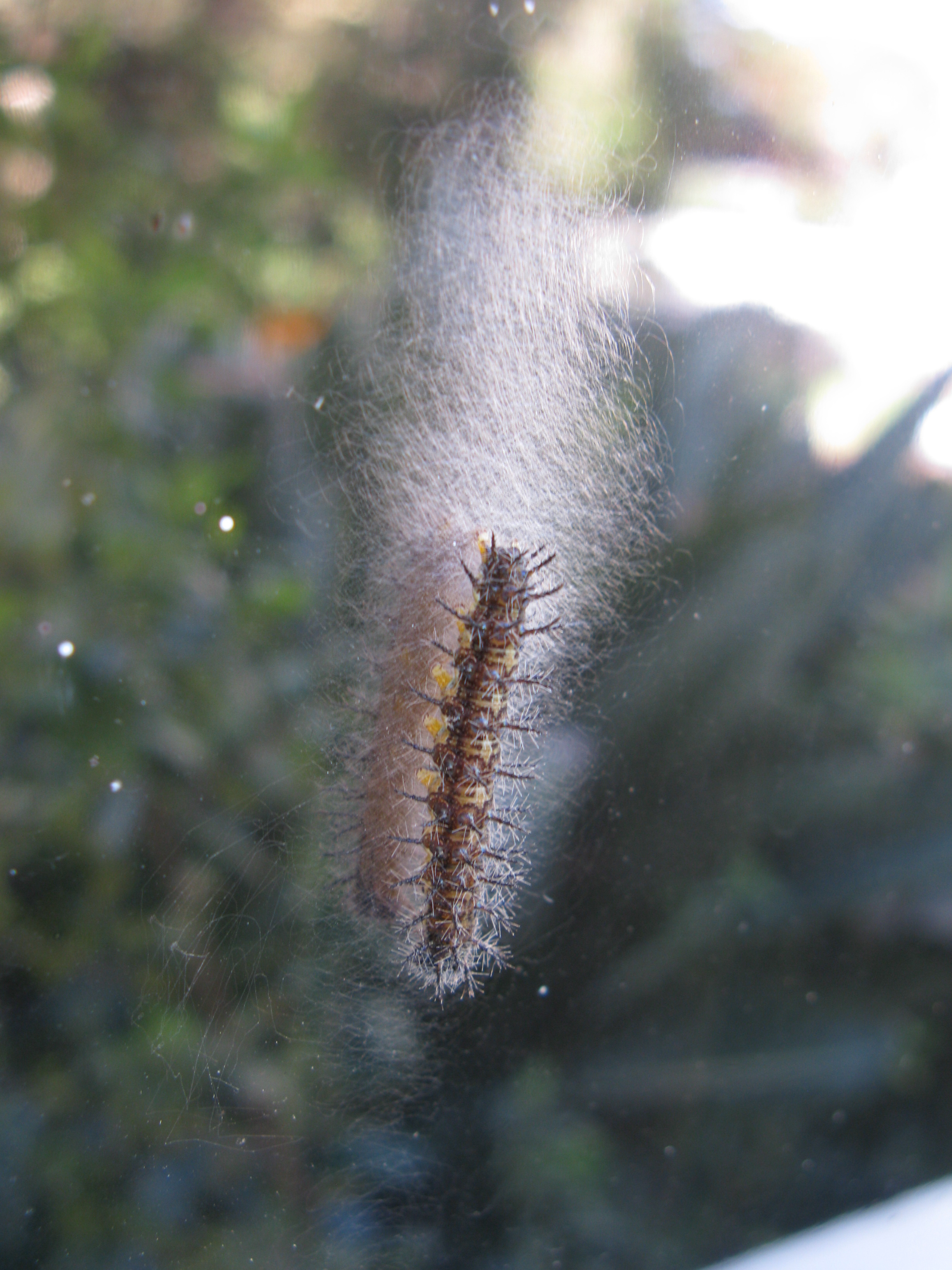
Pupating on glass, which renders visible the spun silken mat that it grips onto

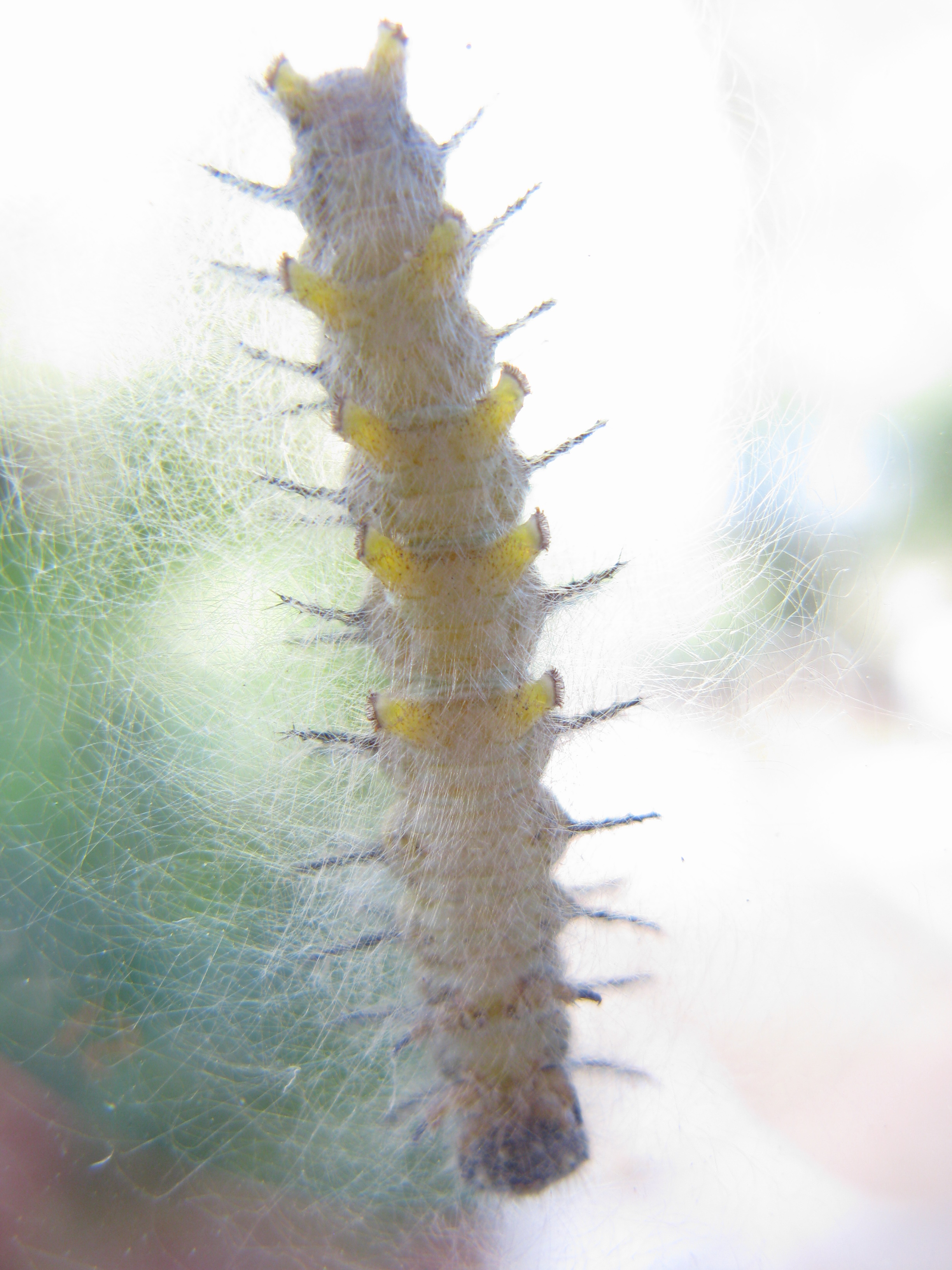
Ventral view: pupating on glass, showing details of its crochets which grip the silk mat

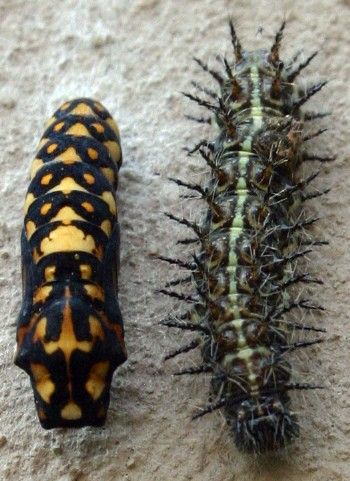
Pupa and larva

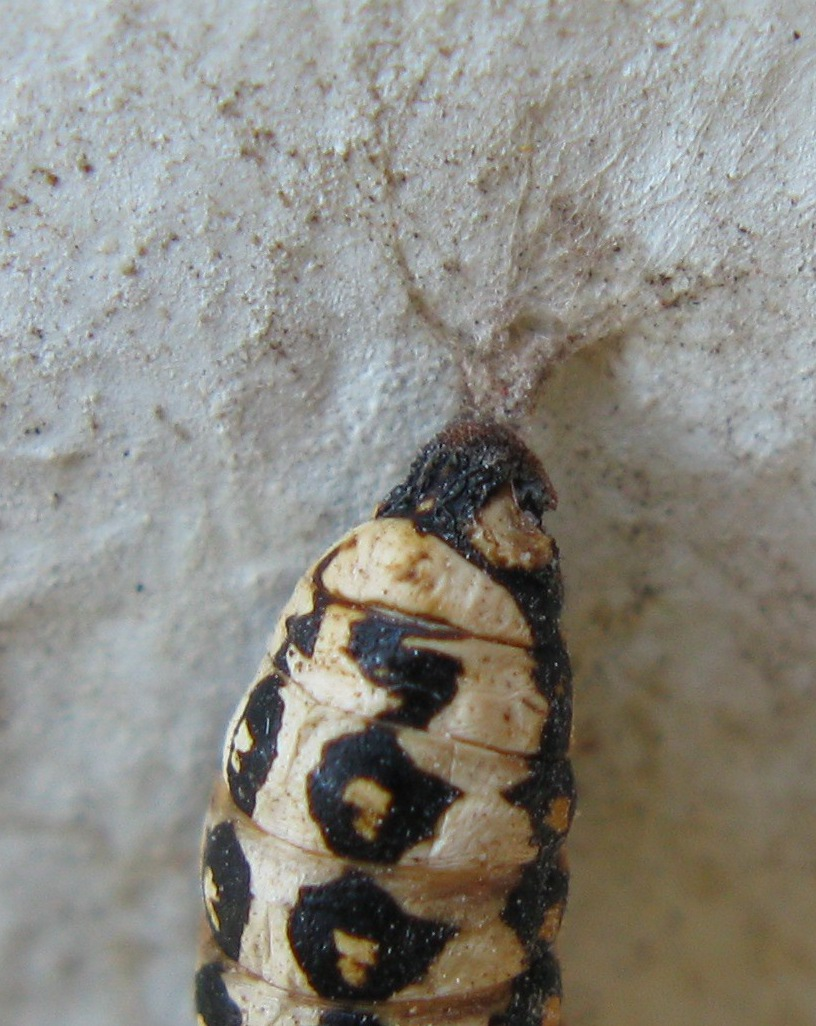
Pupal attachment, by crochets on posterior prolegs, to silken mat spun onto a masonry wall
