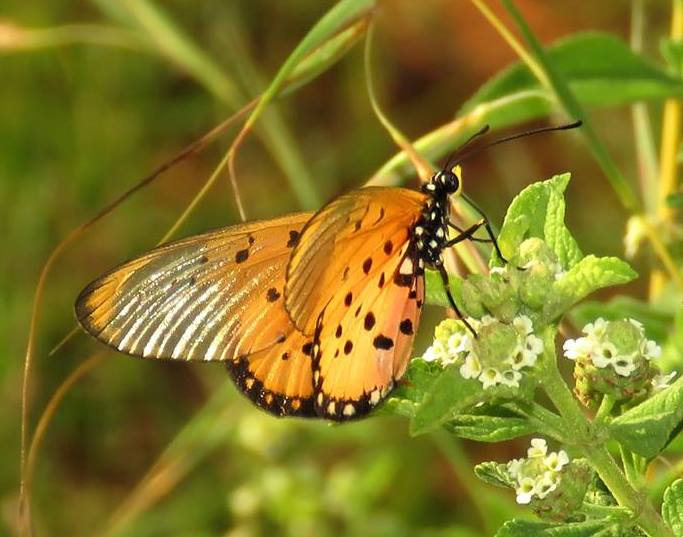
- Acraea neobule subsp. neobule

Scientific classification
- Kingdom: Animalia
- Phylum: Arthropoda
- Clade: Pancrustacea
- Class: Insecta
- Order: Lepidoptera
- Family: Nymphalidae
- Genus: Acraea
- Species: A. neobule

Binomial name
- Acraea neobule Doubleday, [1847]

Synonyms
- Acroea seis Feisthamel, 1850; Acraea calyce Godman and Salvin, 1884; Acraea mhondana Vuillot, 1891; Acraea arabica Rebel, 1899; Acraea neobule socotrana Rebel, 1907; Acraea zambesina Aurivillius, 1909; Acraea neobule braesioides Wichgraf, 1914; Acraea neobule ab. guttata Wichgraf, 1914; Acraea violae neobule f. incredibilis Le Doux, 1922; Acraea violae neobule f. camaenopsis Le Doux, 1923; Acraea neobule seis f. cyaniris Le Cerf, 1927; Acraea terpsichore neobule f. kibwezina Le Doux, 1928; Acraea neobule f. isabellina Stoneham, 1943; Acraea neobule f. didalis Stoneham, 1943; Acraea neobule f. montana Stoneham, 1943; Acraea neobule f. macra Storace, 1949; Acraea neobule f. pallidepicta Storace, 1949; Acraea neobule f. sheba Gabriel, 1954; Acraea neobule f. melanica Woodhall, 2000

= Acraea neobule =

Species of butterfly

Acraea neobule, the wandering donkey acraea, is a butterfly of the family Nymphalidae. It is found in Sub-Saharan Africa and south-western Arabia.

== Description ==
A. neobule Dbl. and Hew. (53 f). Forewing above thinly scaled with light orange- yellow or ochre-yellow as far as the discal dots in 4 to 6 and in addition often at the distal margin in cellules 5 to 8, otherwise in the apical part hyaline; a spot beyond the middle of the cell, a transverse streak at the end of the cell and the discal dots often distinct, the discal dots in 2 and 3, however, not seldom wanting. Hindwing on both surfaces orange-yellow with distinct discal dots, of which the one in 4 is nearer to the distal margin than the rest; marginal band 1 to 1.5 mm. in breadth with rounded light marginal spots. Throughout South and East Africa to Angola, Zimbabwe, Sudan and Ethiopia.- seis Feisth. has the fore wing scaled wdth yellow in cellules 1 a to 2 as far as the distal margin and in cellules 3 to 8 distinct yellow marginal spots and consequently only in cellules 3 to 6 a hyaline subapical band; occasionally the yellow is replaced by black-grey or dark brown, especially in the female. Senegal to Nigeria, particularly in the interior. -zambesina Auriv. is very similar to neobule, but has the forewing completely scaled with red-yellow without diaphanous subapical area but with narrow marginal band 1 mm. in breadth, triangularly widened at the extremities of the veins; discal dots of both wings as in neobule) on the underside of the hindwing the white basal dots are smaller and of almost uniform size. Mozambique: Zumbo to the Zambezi River. -arabica Rbl. completely agrees above with the race seis, but differs from all the neobuleforms in having the basal dots on the underside of the hindwing smaller and placed quite free; marginal spots of the hind wing small and elongate almost as in horta. South Arabia

The wingspan is 48–55 mm for males and 50–56 mm for females.

== Subspecies ==
- Acraea neobule subsp. neobule

Range: Senegal, Gambia, Guinea-Bissau, Guinea, Burkina-Faso, Liberia, Ivory Coast, Mali, Ghana, Togo, Benin, Niger, Nigeria, Cameroon, Equatorial Guinea, Gabon, Congo, Central African Republic, Angola, DRC, Sudan, Uganda, Kenya, Ethiopia, Somalia, Tanzania, Malawi, Zambia, Mozambique, Zimbabwe, Botswana, Namibia, South Africa, Eswatini, Lesotho, Saudi Arabia, Yemen, Oman

- Acraea neobule subsp. legrandi Carcasson, 1964

Range: Seychelles

Torben Larsen developed a species numbering system for his 2005 publication Butterflies of West Africa. The nominate subspecies is #1185. The 'Larsen' numbers have since been used with permission in A Sharp Eye on Butterflies of Ghana.

== Biology ==
Adults are on the wing year round, but are more common from September to April.

The larvae feed on Passiflora edulis, Passiflora incarnata, Adenia gummifera and Hybanthus species.

== Taxonomy ==
It is a member of the Acraea terpsicore species group. But see also Pierre & Bernaud, 2014.
