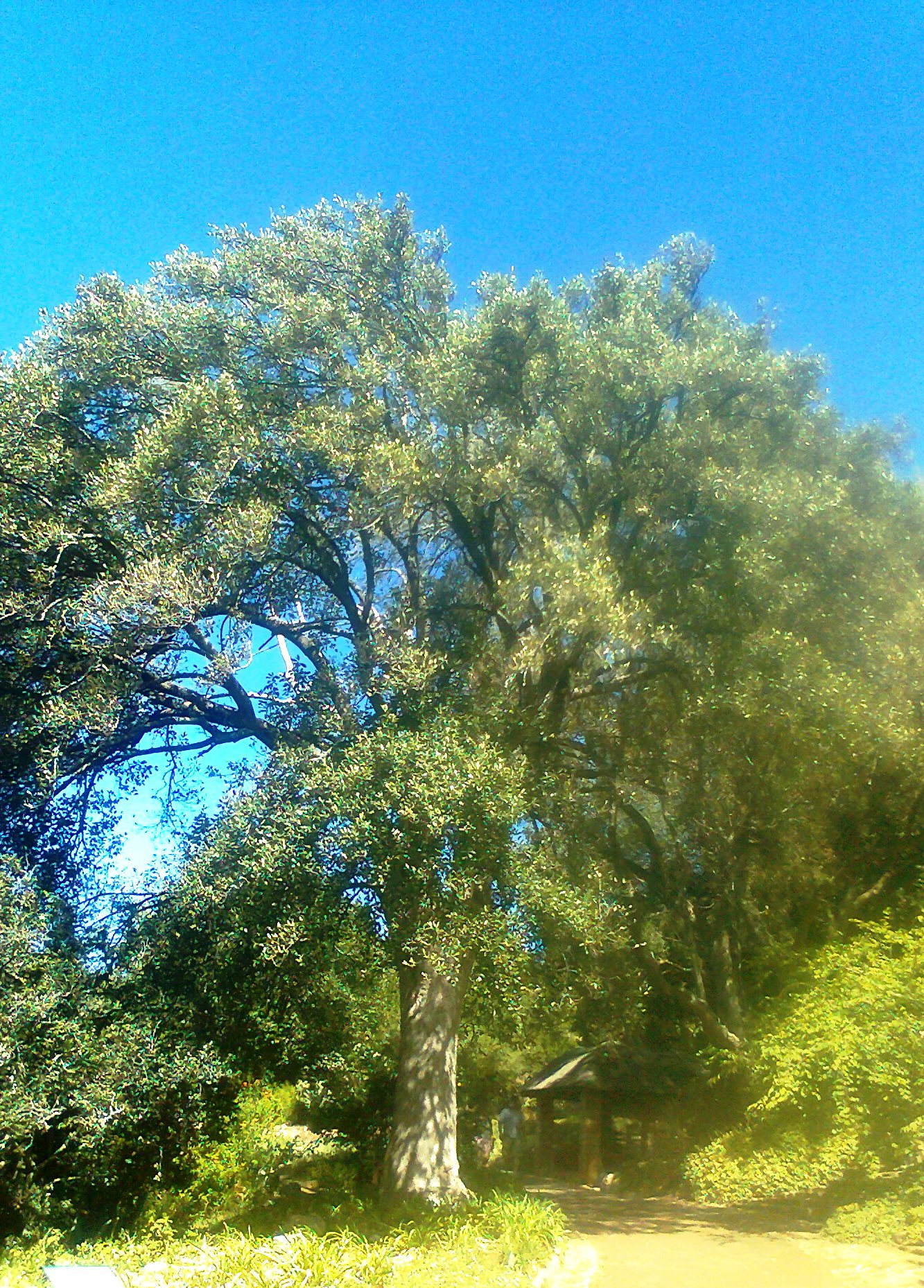

Scientific classification
- Kingdom: Plantae
- Clade: Tracheophytes
- Clade: Angiosperms
- Clade: Eudicots
- Clade: Rosids
- Order: Malpighiales
- Family: Achariaceae
- Genus: Kiggelaria; L.
- Species: K. africana

Binomial name
- Kiggelaria africana L.

= Kiggelaria =

Genus of trees

Kiggelaria africana (also known as the wild peach or umKokoko) is a large, robust, low-branching African tree, and is currently the only accepted species in the genus Kiggelaria.

Despite its common name, Kiggelaria africana is not related to the more familiar fruit-producing peach tree (Prunus persica) although the leaves do look similar, if only very superficially. Unlike peach leaves, they are fairly thick and stiff, with a thin coating of fur on the undersides.

== Appearance ==
A well-shaped, robust, evergreen tree with grey-green leaves, it grows up to 20 m (66 ft) in the wild. The smooth bark is pale grey in colour and the tree tends to be low-branching. The wild peach is dioecious (having separate male and female trees) and its tiny flowers are bell-shaped and a yellowish colour. The flowers are followed later in the summer by round, green capsules. These split open once ripe and the seeds, which are each covered in a layer of bright orange-red flesh, are eaten and spread by birds.

== Distribution ==
This tree grows across southern and eastern Africa - from Cape Town in the south, northwards as far as Kenya. It occurs naturally in Afromontane forests as well as by the coast, in bushveld and along rivers.

== Growing Kiggelaria africana ==
The wild peach is a very tough, hardy and fast-growing tree. It prefers a sunny position (but tolerates shade) and a moderate amount of water. It also survives frost. It naturally forms a large shade tree with a gentle, non-invasive root system, but also makes a good windbreak or hedge. If a conventional "tree shape" is required, then the shoots that grow from the tree's lower trunk should be removed. A multitude of birds enjoy the tiny red fruits and will consequently be attracted to this tree, as are Acraea horta butterflies. Their caterpillars sometimes eat the tree bare, but this is part of a natural process and the Kiggelaria trees always rapidly regrow their foliage.

This tree can easily be propagated from seed. Young plants grow fast and begin flowering after only a year or two.

== Gallery ==
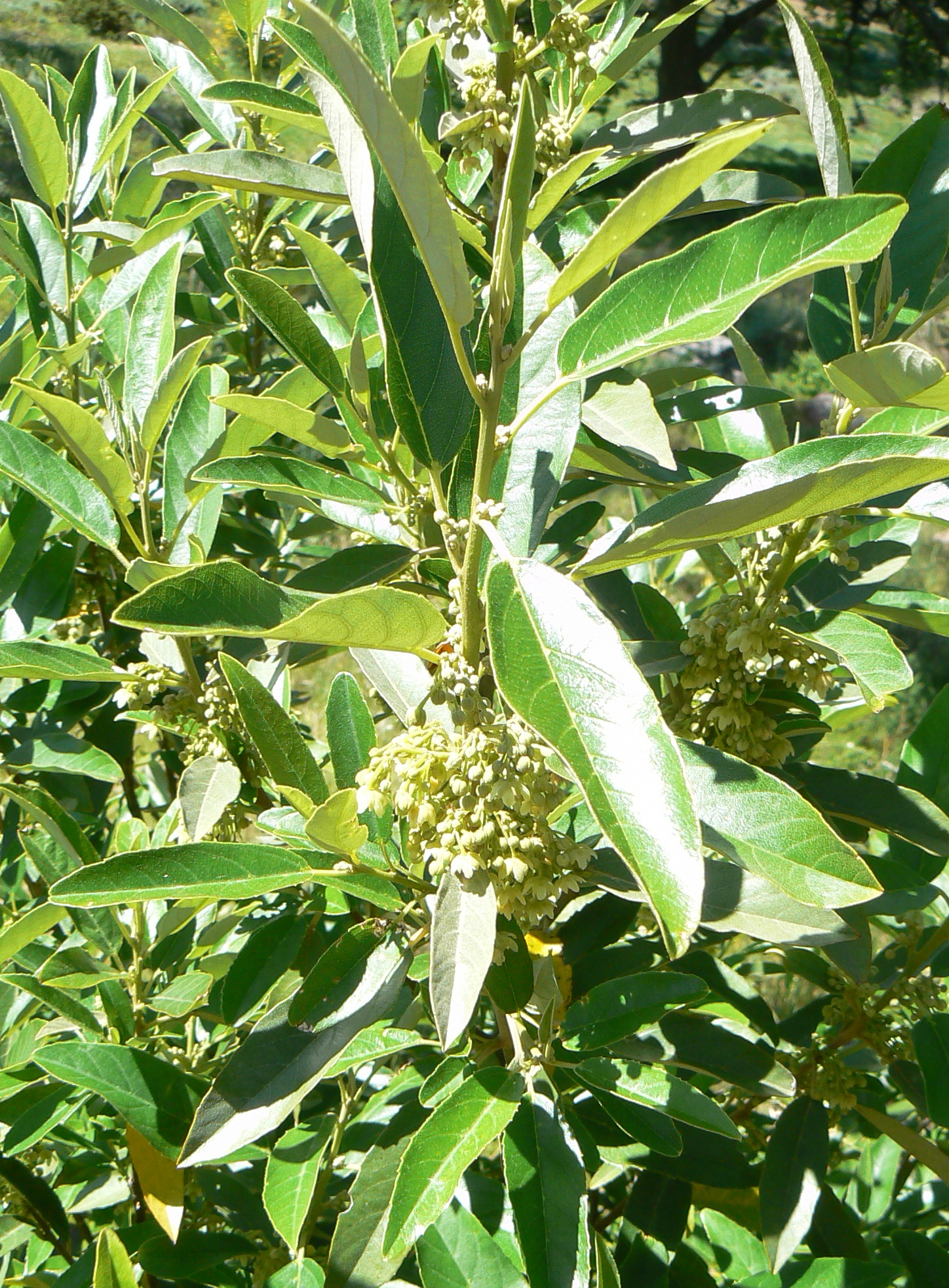
Detail of the foliage

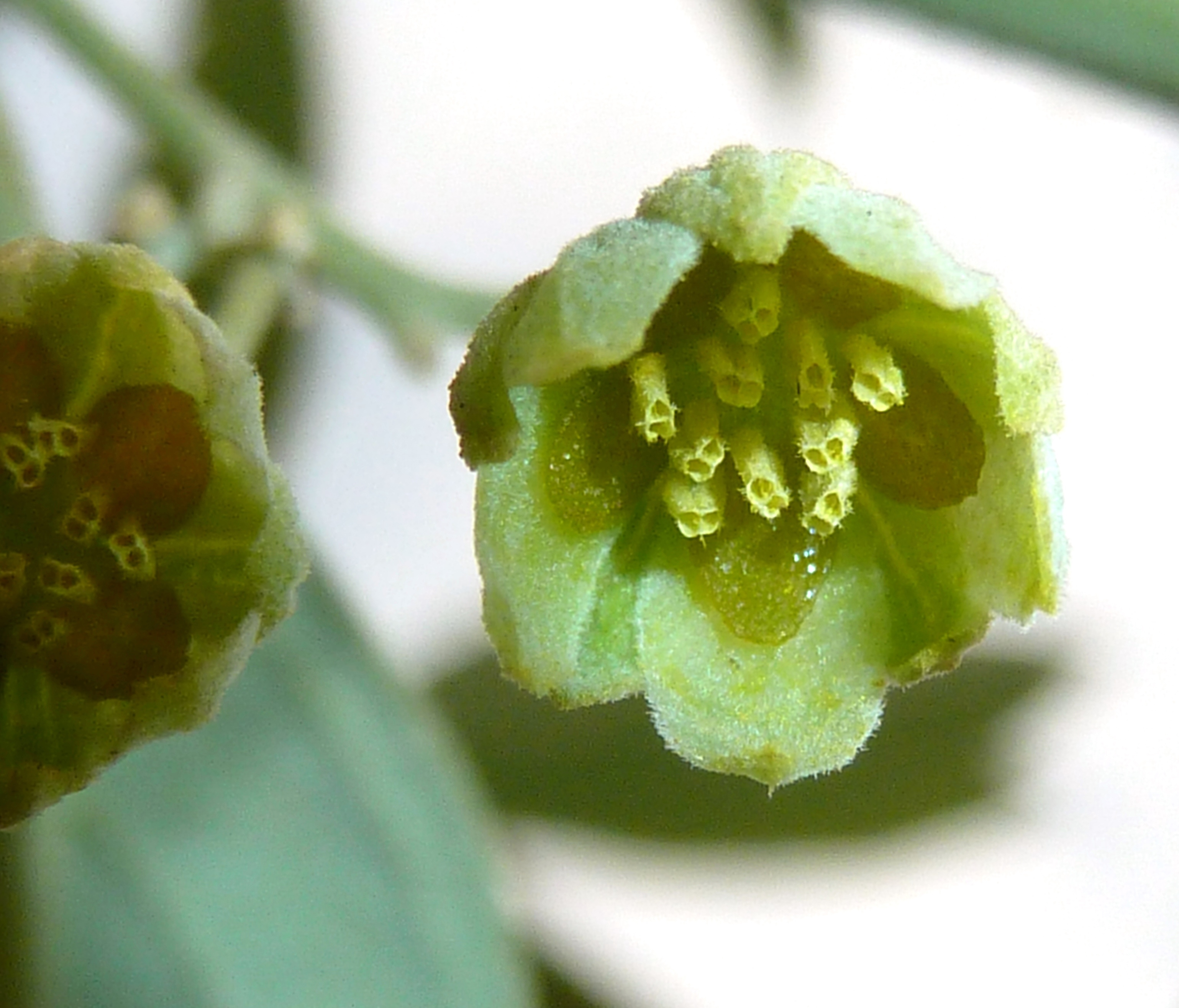
Detail of male flower

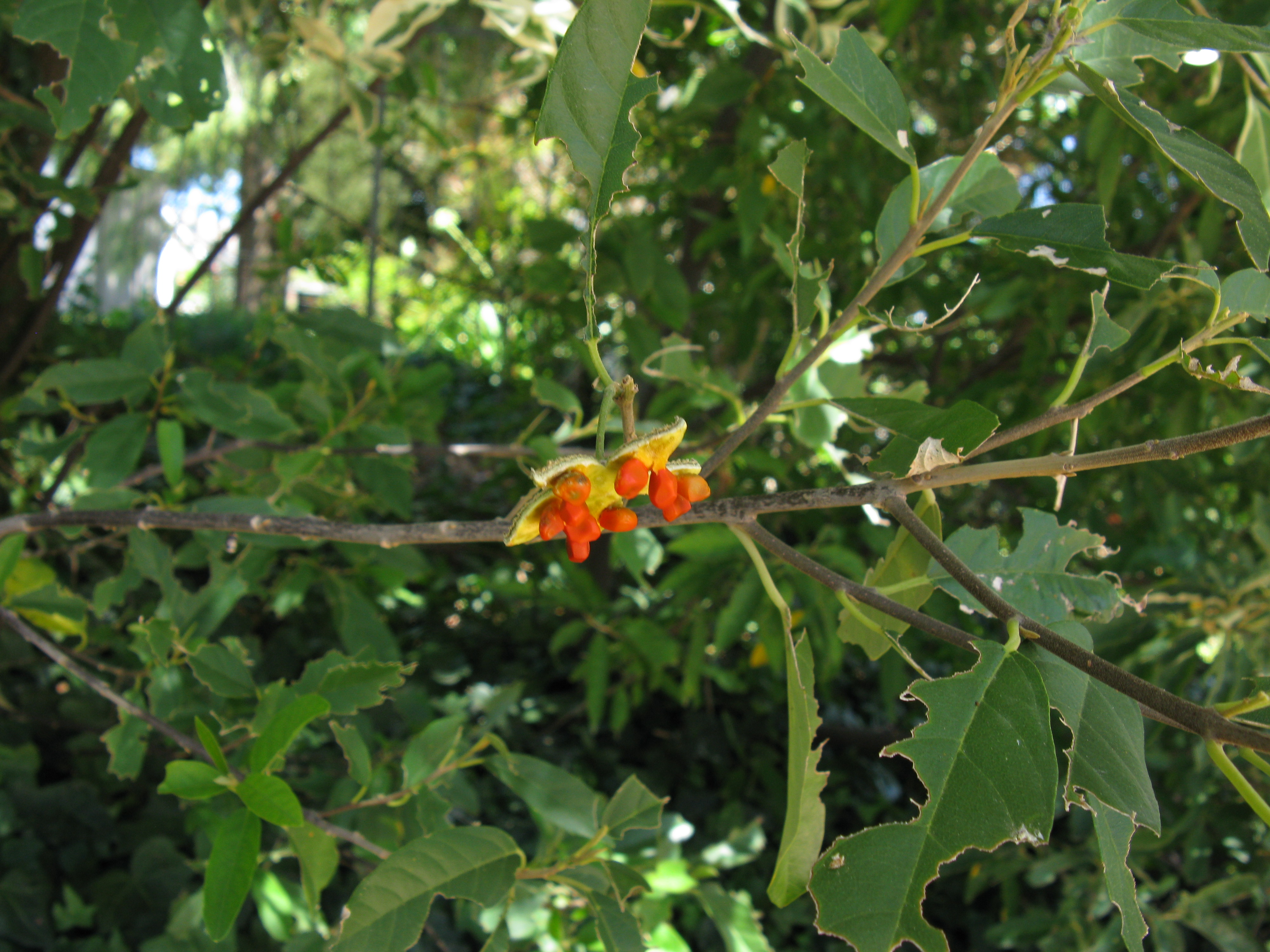
Open fruit capsule. The leaf damage is largely caused by larvae of the butterfly Acraea horta

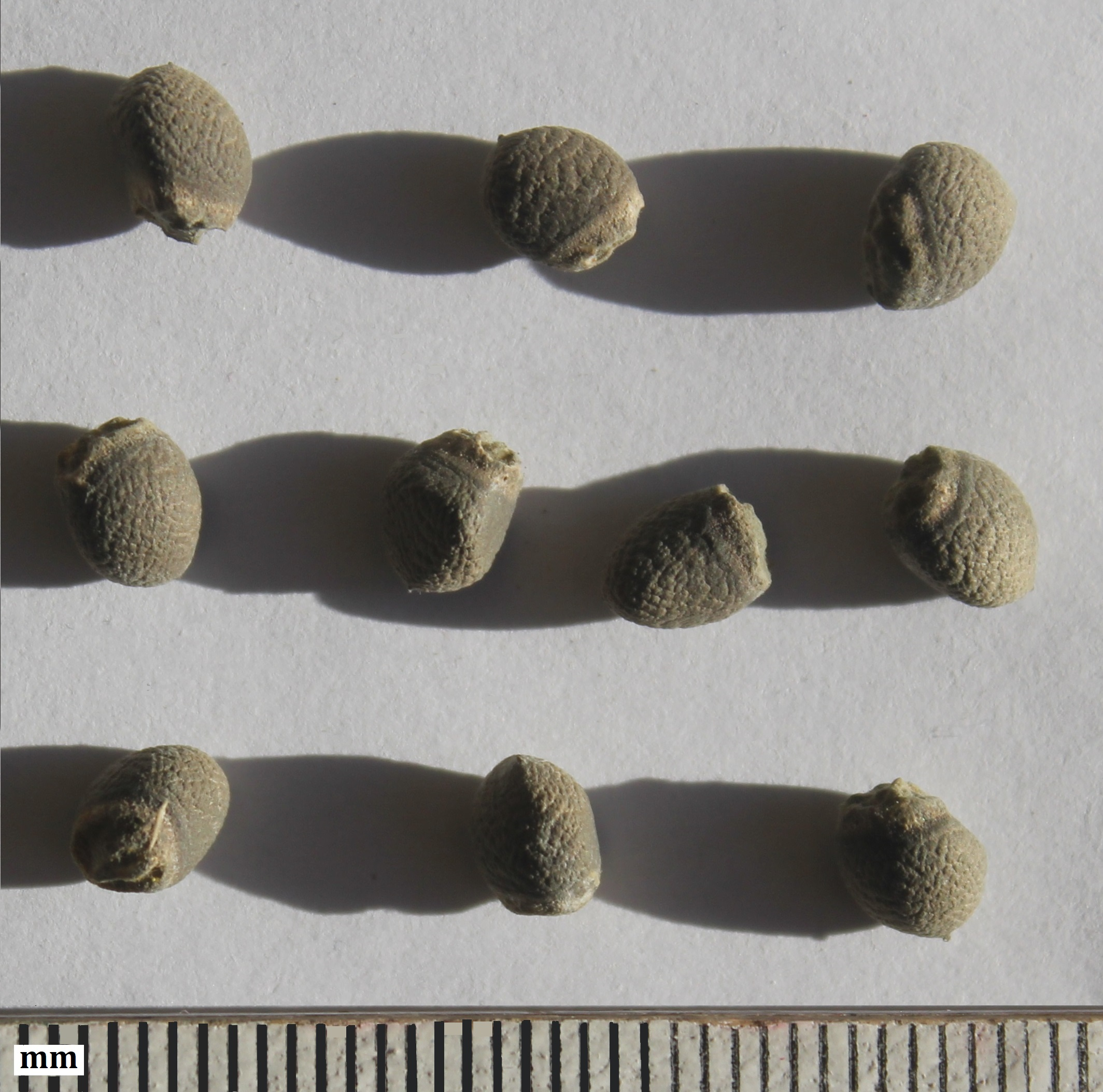
Seeds
