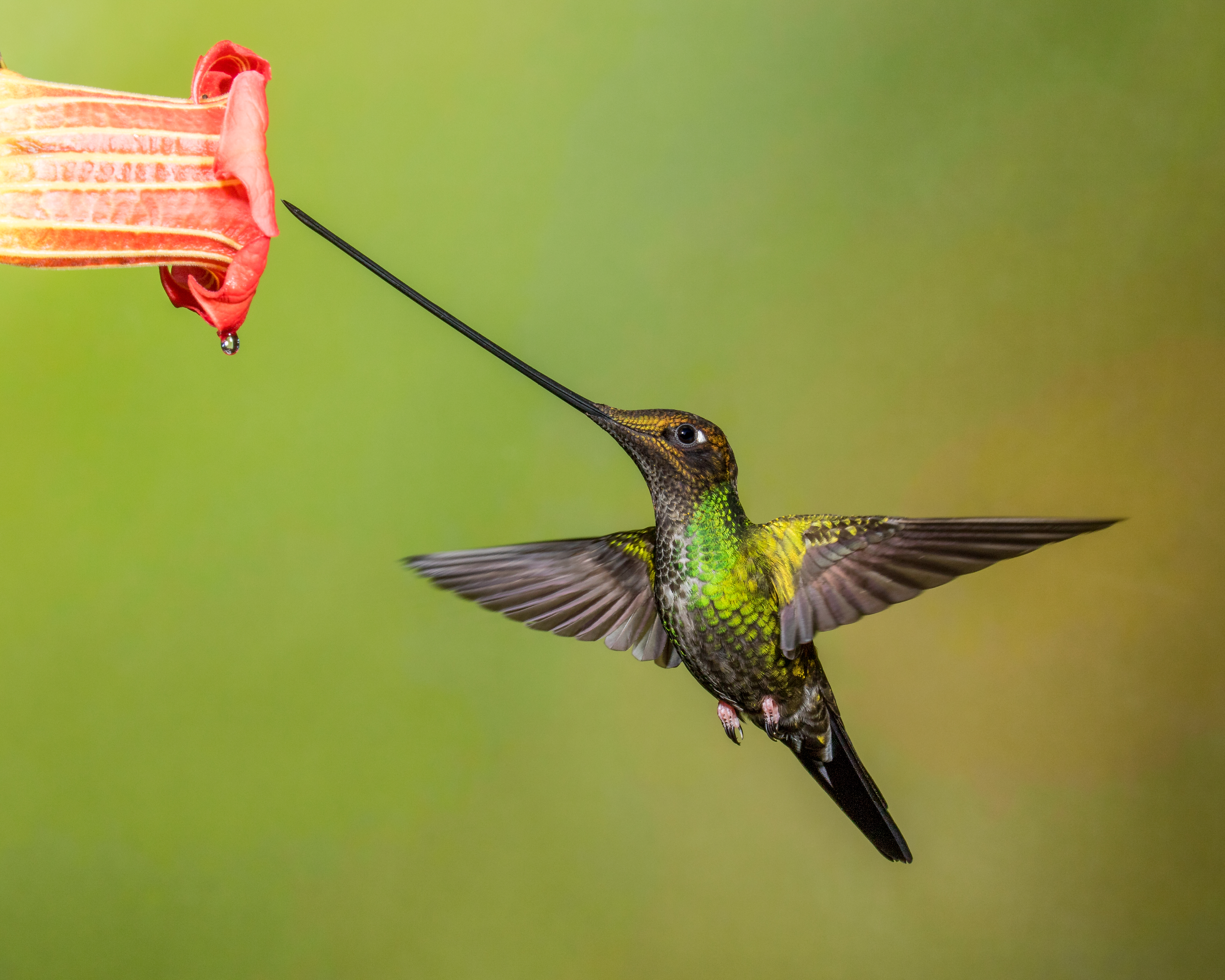
- Male
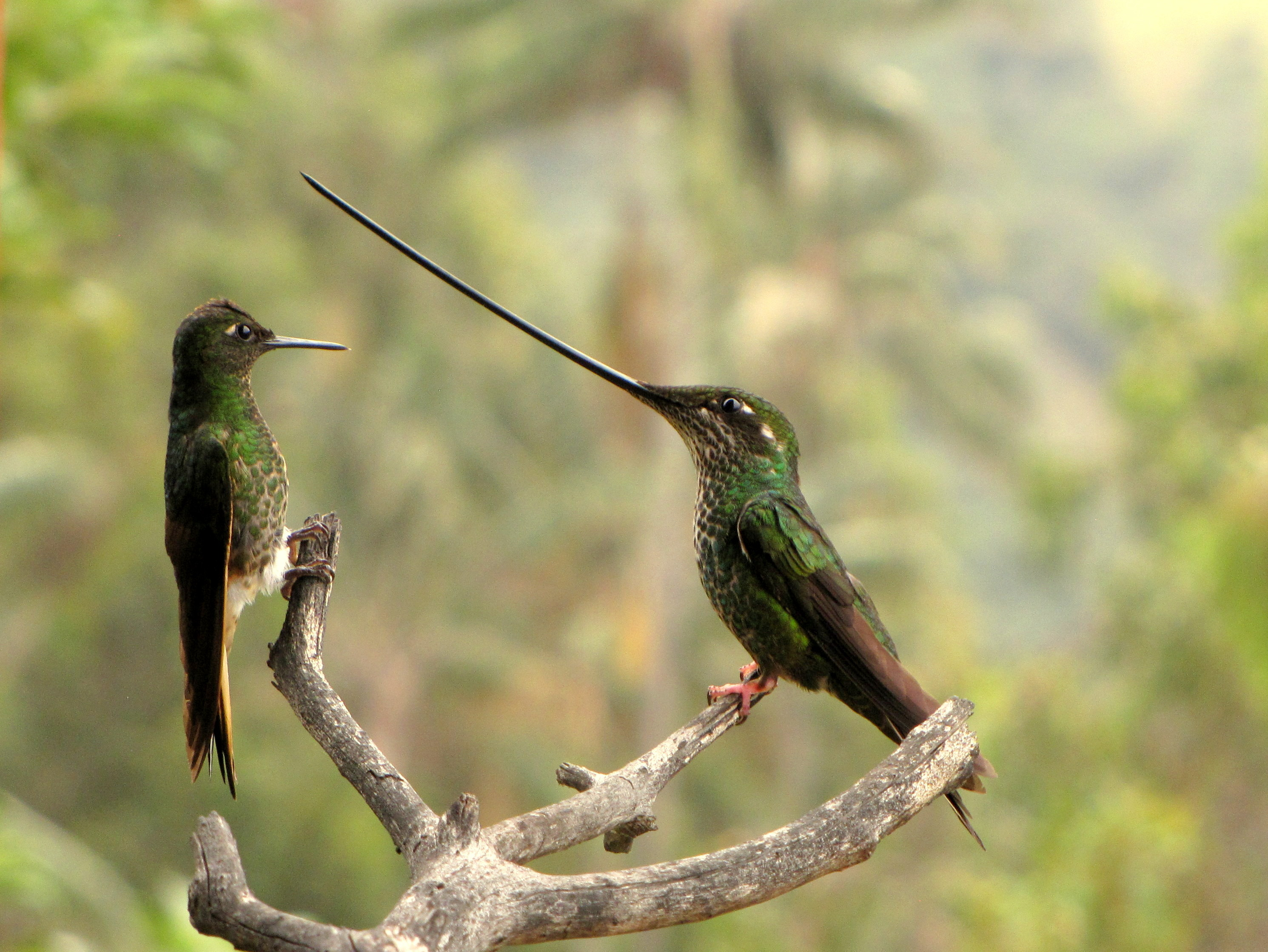
- Female sword-billed hummingbird (right) with a buff-tailed coronet Call

Conservation status
- Least Concern (IUCN 3.1)
- CITES Appendix II

Scientific classification
- Kingdom: Animalia
- Phylum: Chordata
- Class: Aves
- Order: Apodiformes
- Family: Trochilidae
- Tribe: Heliantheini
- Genus: Ensifera; Lesson, 1843
- Species: E. ensifera

Binomial name
- Ensifera ensifera (Boissonneau, 1840)
- Distribution range of the sword-billed hummingbird

Synonyms
- Ornismya ensifera Boissonneau, 1840

= Sword-billed hummingbird =

Species of bird from South America

The sword-billed hummingbird (Ensifera ensifera), also known as the swordbill, is a neotropical species of hummingbird from the Andean regions of South America. It is the only member in the genus Ensifera. Among the largest species of hummingbird, it is characterized by its unusually long bill, being the only bird to have a beak longer than the rest of its body, excluding the tail. It uses its bill to drink nectar from flowers with long corollas and has coevolved with the species Passiflora mixta. While most hummingbirds preen using their bills, the sword-billed hummingbird uses its feet to scratch and preen due to its bill being so long.

The sword-billed hummingbird is a trap-line feeder and feeds on nectar, especially from Passiflora mixta and other passionflowers. It also hawks for insects. It breeds from February to March and builds cup nests using moss. The sword-billed hummingbird is listed as being of least concern by the International Union for Conservation of Nature (IUCN) on the IUCN Red List, but is threatened by climate change and deforestation.

== Taxonomy and systematics ==
The sword-billed hummingbird was first described as Ornismya ensifera by Auguste Boissonneau in 1839 on the basis of specimens from Santa Fé, Bogotá, Colombia. It was moved to the genus Ensifera in 1843 by René Lesson. The generic and specific name ensifera is derived from the Latin words ensis (sword) and ferre (to carry) and means sword-wielder, referring to the species' large beak. Sword-billed hummingbird is the official common name designated by the International Ornithologists' Union. Other common names for the species include sword billed hummingbird, swordbill, and swordbill hummingbird.

The sword-billed hummingbird is the only species in the genus Ensifera. In 1939, Ensifera ensifera caerulescens was described as a subspecies by Willoughby Lowe on the basis of a specimen from the Royal Albert Memorial Museum. However, it has since been lumped with the nominate subspecies as it is likely that the specimen had either aberrant plumage or was discolored. The species is now considered monotypic.

== Description ==
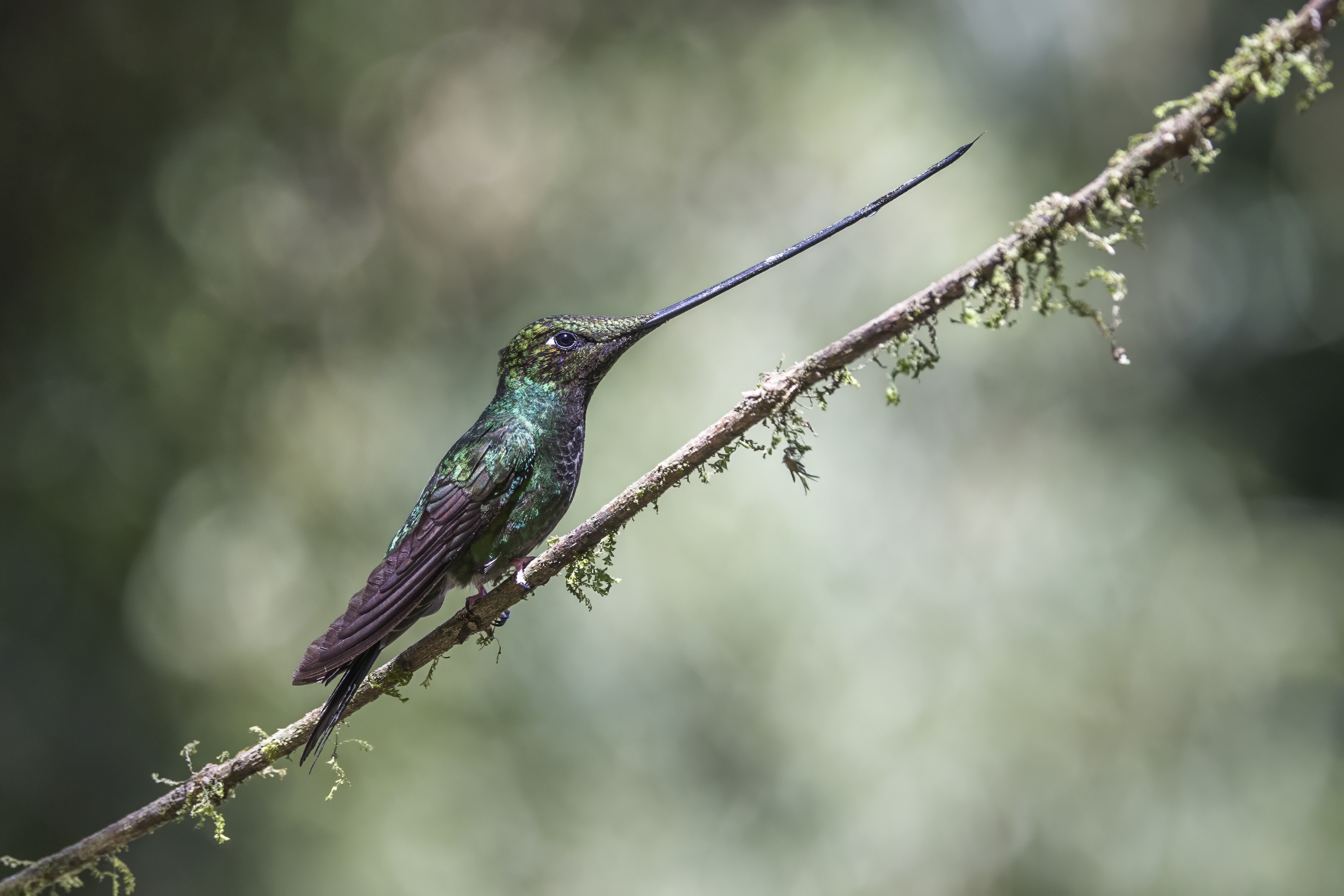
Male sword-billed hummingbird in Caldas, Colombia

The sword-billed hummingbird is among the largest species of hummingbirds. Adults are 13–14 centimetres (5.1–5.5 in) long excluding the bill and weigh 10–15 g (0.35–0.53 oz), with males being slightly larger on average than females. The most distinctive feature of the species is the enormous bill, which is 8–12 centimetres (3.1–4.7 in) long. The bill is the largest of any hummingbird and the largest with respect to body length for any bird.

The sword-billed hummingbird displays sexual dimorphism. Males have shorter bills but longer wings and tails than females. Males have bronze-green upperparts with coppery-bronze heads, a discreet white spot behind the eye, dusky throats, metallic green underparts, a dark gray belly, and a forked blackish bronze-green tail. Some males have white on the chin and throat. Females have similar upperparts, but have white underparts and grayish throats and bellies speckled with green. The tail is less deeply forked and is edged grayish white. Juveniles look similar to females.

The sword-billed hummingbird is the only known bird whose bill is longer than the rest of the body, excluding the tail. It is black, heavy, and slightly upturned. The extremely long bill helps the species feed on flowers with long corollas that are inaccessible to other species.

=== Vocalizations ===
The sword-billed hummingbird makes a low, guttural, slightly trilled trrr.

== Habitat and distribution ==
The sword-billed hummingbird is found in the Andes from western Venezuela through Colombia, Ecuador, and Peru to Bolivia. It inhabits humid and wet montane forest, forest edges, shrubland, gardens, and patches of páramo at elevations of 1,700–3,500 m (5,580–11,480 ft), but is most common at elevations of 2,400–3,100 m (7,870–10,170 ft). The species is generally non-migratory, but shows localized movements in Colombia and northwestern Venezuela, where it moves to higher altitudes in the early wet season and returns to lower elevations in the dry season.

The sword-billed hummingbird's distribution correlates with the distribution of species of the subgenus Tacsonia in the genus Passiflora, due to its highly specialized bill and feeding habits.

== Behavior and ecology ==
As is characteristic of hummingbirds, the sword-billed hummingbird can fly backwards and hover in the air. It also exhibits higher than average wing-disk loading than other members of its family.

=== Diet and feeding ===
The sword-billed hummingbird is a specialist feeder, feeding mainly on the nectar of flowers with long corollas, including Brugmansia sanguinea, Datura stramonium, Passiflora mixta, P. pinnatistiplua, P. mollissima and P. sexflora, along with flowers from the genera Aethanthus, Fuchsia, Salpichroa, and Solanum. It probes flowers from below while feeding, and is a trap-line feeder, visiting a specific series of flowers in a regular, consistent sequence. It also hawks for insects, catching flying insects by keeping the bill open.

=== Perching and preening ===
The sword-billed hummingbird perches with its bill angled upwards to reduce the strain of the heavy beak and improve balance. The length of the bill is so long, it also forces the sword-billed hummingbird to use its feet to groom, even though this takes longer than traditional beak methods. Preening is important to remove ectoparasites and spread oil across the feathers.

=== Reproduction ===
Breeding occurs from February to March. Nests are cup-shaped and made of moss, and are usually hung among root fibers high above the ground.

=== Co-evolution with Passiflora mixta ===
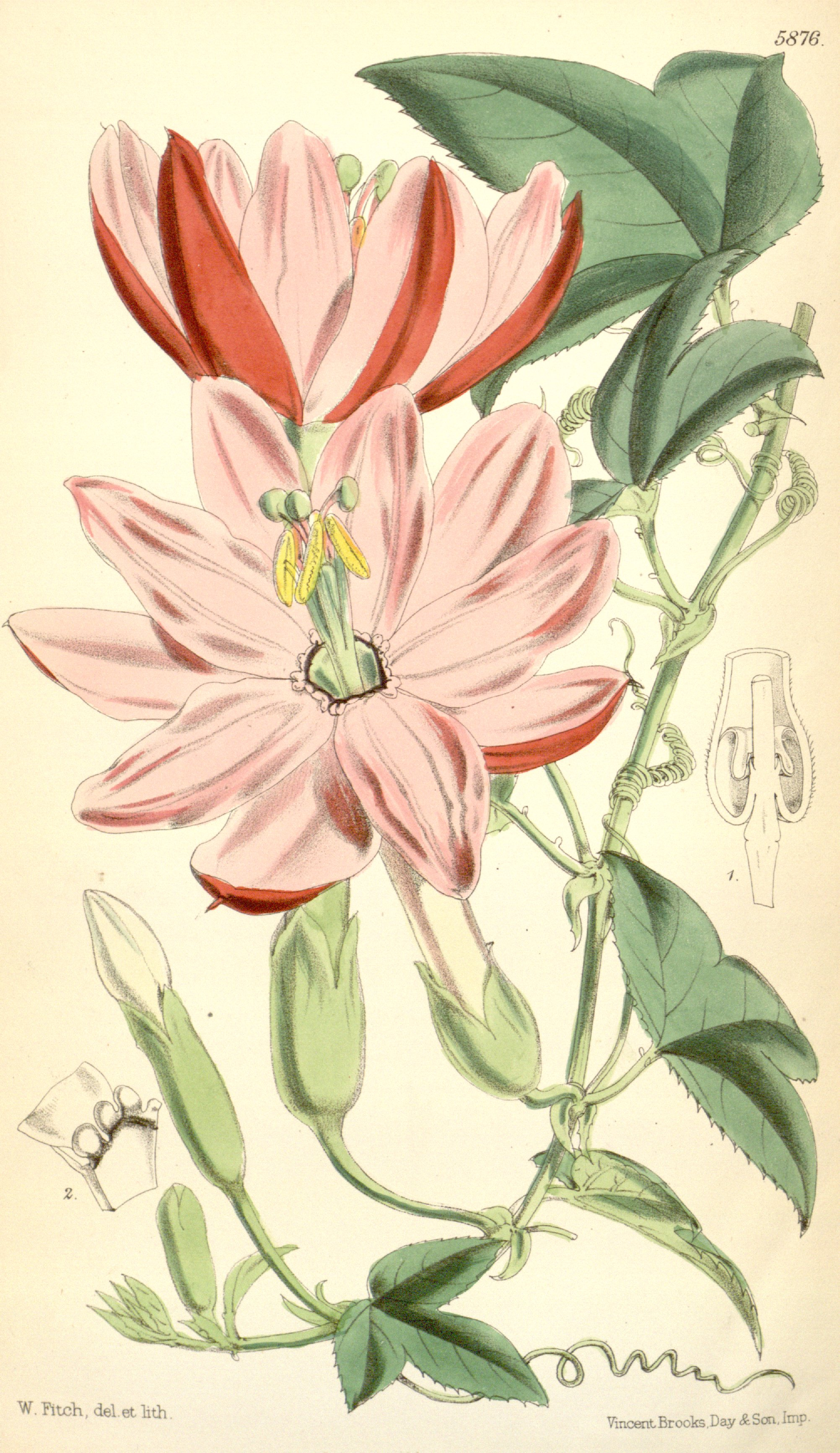
The long corolla of Passiflora mixta is coevolved with the bird's bill as a pollination strategy.

The sword-billed hummingbird displays extreme coevolution with the passionflower Passiflora mixta. The two species evolved together during the early radiation of the subgenus Tacsonia, because the species exclusively pollinated P. mixta. The position of the flower's anthers and stigmas, along with the length of the corolla tube, make it an inaccessible food source to nearly every species except the sword-billed hummingbird. This mutualistic relationship lets P. mixta depend on the bird for pollination, while the bird obtains a high-quality food source. To obtain nectar, the hummingbird will stick its long bill down the tube of the corolla (both of which are almost exactly the same length), drink, and then retreat and hover for a few seconds before repeating the process. Other species, such as insects, may be able to access the flower's nectar but do so by puncturing the base and feeding through a hole instead of the corolla tube. Additional evidence of coevolution is that both species also inhabit the same territory range along the Andean mountains. If sword-billed hummingbird populations were to decline, there would most likely be a negative impact on the abundance of P. mixta flowers due to their extreme coevolution.

== Status and conservation ==
The sword-billed hummingbird is listed as being of least concern by the International Union for Conservation of Nature (IUCN) on the IUCN Red List due to its large range, lack of significant population decline, and lack of major threats. There is also no census on global number of individuals, because of the large range of occurrence and uncommon sightings. It has adapted to man-made habitats in some areas and is also known to occur in several protected areas. Climate change and deforestation are the two most probable threats to the sword-billed hummingbird as they may lead to habitat loss and a decrease in food sources, especially of Passiflora mixta.

== In art and media ==
The BBC's documentary series Planet Earth II depicted the sword-billed hummingbird flying through the forest in the episode "Jungles".
