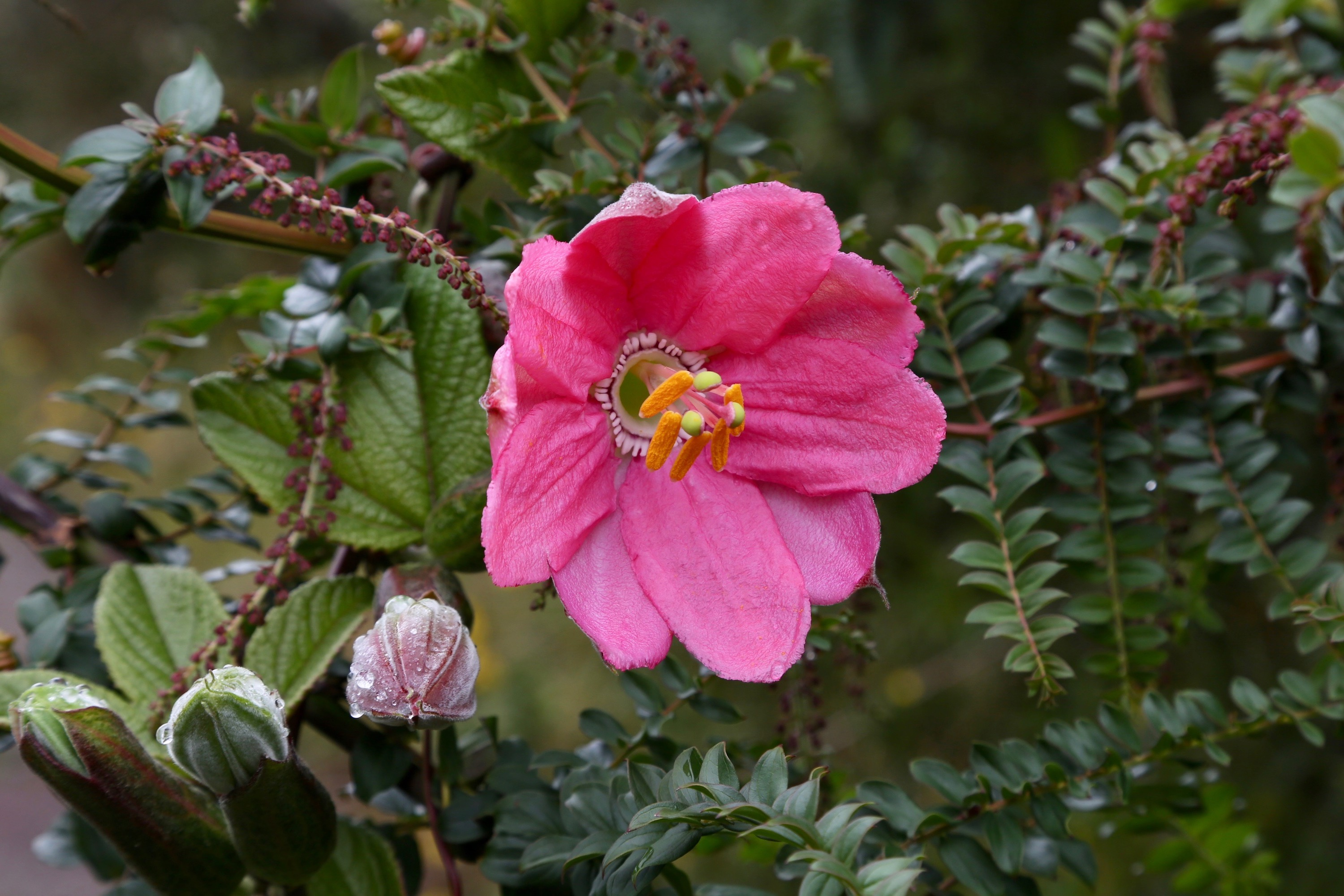

Scientific classification
- Kingdom: Plantae
- Clade: Tracheophytes
- Clade: Angiosperms
- Clade: Eudicots
- Clade: Rosids
- Order: Malpighiales
- Family: Passifloraceae
- Genus: Passiflora
- Species: P. mixta

Binomial name
- Passiflora mixta L.f.

= Passiflora mixta =

Species of vine

Passiflora mixta, from the family Passifloraceae is also known as curuba (in Colombia), curuba de indio, curuba de monte, curubita, parcha (in Venezuela), and taxo (in Ecuador). Originally, it derived from the monophyletic Passiflora subgenus Tacsonia. Passiflora mixta is endemic to the Americas. A perennial vine, the Passiflora mixta is pink to orange-red in color.

== Description ==
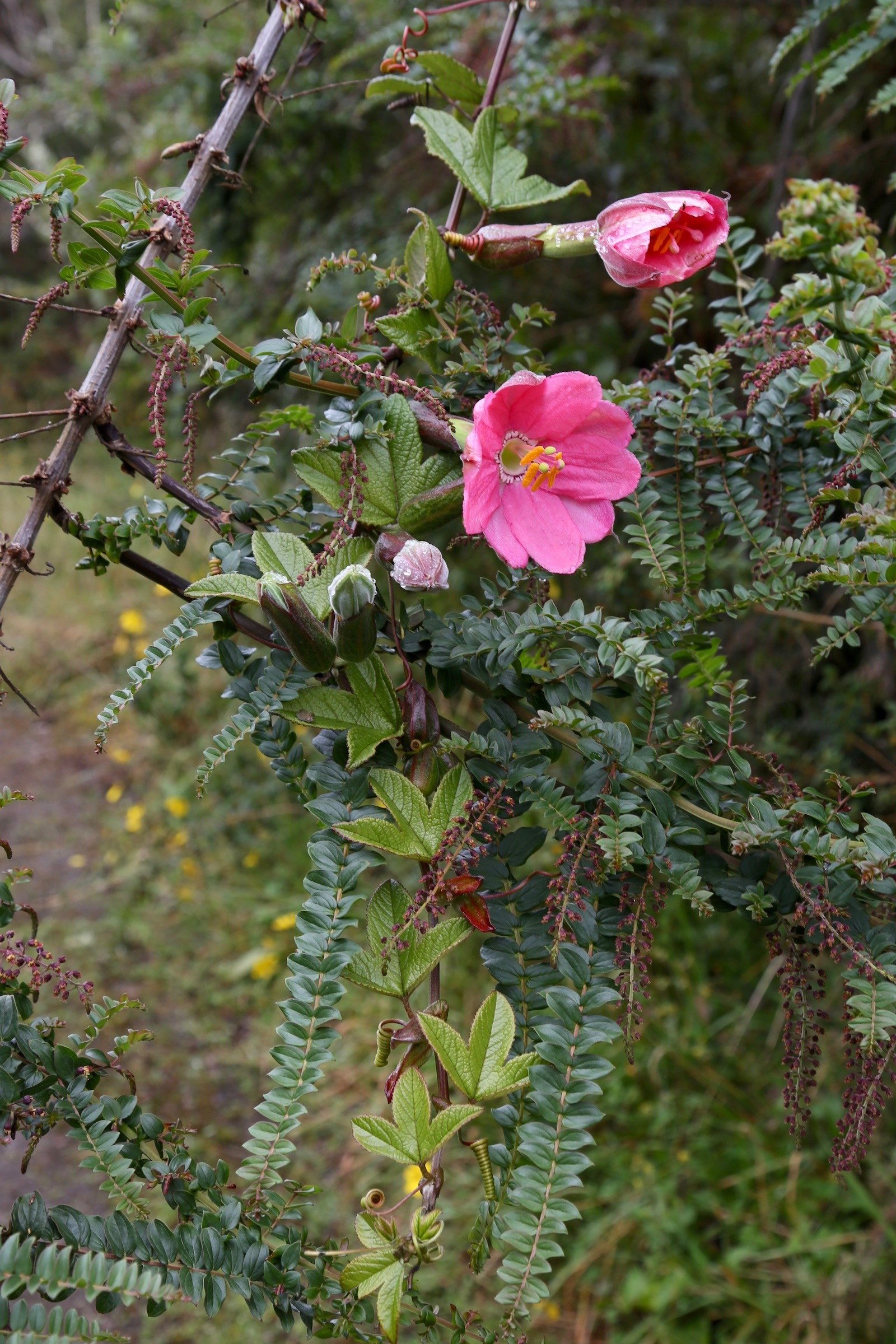
Ecuador, Napo Province, Papallacta

Passiflora mixta can be identified by its large pink flowers and trilobate coricaeous leaves, which are tubular in shape and protrude from its branches. It has a hairy elongated bract and 7–15 cm long (2.8–5.9 in) hypanthium (flower tube) that contains a narrow nectar chamber. The ovaries, anthers, and stigmas are located anterior to the hypanthium near the androgynophore. The species is capable of producing fruits and flowers that remain open for 3 to 5 days by producing half-pendant, horizontal, or erect flowers.

The species is wild, collected, and an important genetic resource for banana passionfruit breeding.

=== Morphology ===
- Stem – Sub five-angular
- Leaf pubescence – Not present on the upper surface; however, missing to seldom dense on the lower surface
- Stipules are moderate to large in size, 6–20 mm in length, 12–30 mm wide (0.47–1.18 in), reniform, dentate or serrate, persistent
- Peduncles are robust with a varied length, resulting in half-pendent, horizontal, or erect flowers
- The bracts are joined for half their length or more
- The corolla color ranges from pale pink to intense red, and is campanulate (bell-shaped)
- The floral tube to sepal ratio is 1.6:2.6, and the nectar chamber is slightly broader than the floral tube
- At maturity, the pericarp often appears green, occasionally turning yellow; arils are scarce, and grey to orange in color.

== Pollination ==
This species of Passiflora is pollinated by the sword-billed hummingbird (Ensifera ensifera), which is the only living species in its genus. The hummingbird is found throughout the northern Andes and is identified by its extremely long beak, longer than its entire body. The long beak allows the bird to reach nectar at the bottom of the plant's long corolla tubes.

== Distribution ==
Passiflora mixta ranges from Venezuela to Bolivia, and has been naturalized in Africa and New Zealand. It is restricted to highland areas between 1,700 and 3,700 m (5,600 and 12,100 ft) above sea level. The species can withstand disturbances and is more prominent in dryer environments and lower altitudes than other species of Tacsonia. It grows along the edges of forests and along the margins.
