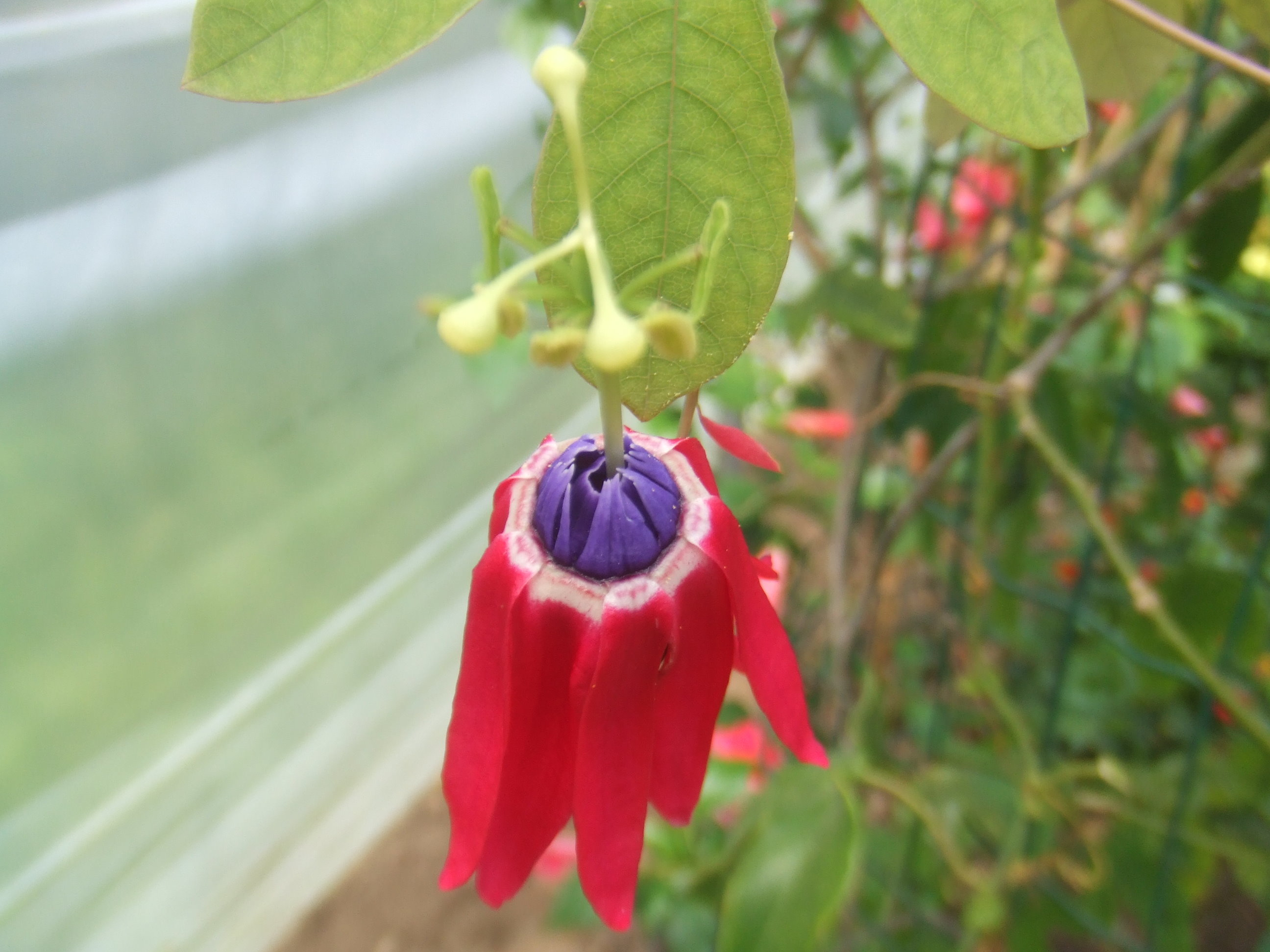
- Passiflora edmundoi flower

Scientific classification
- Kingdom: Plantae
- Clade: Embryophytes
- Clade: Tracheophytes
- Clade: Angiosperms
- Clade: Eudicots
- Clade: Rosids
- Order: Malpighiales
- Family: Passifloraceae
- Genus: Passiflora
- Species: P. edmundoi

Binomial name
- Passiflora edmundoi Sacco

= Passiflora edmundoi =

Species of vine

Passiflora edmundoi is a species in the family Passifloraceae. It is native to western to southwestern Brazil. It is similar to Passiflora kermesina. It is named after Edmundo Pereira, who collected the type specimen.
