= José da Costa Sacco =

José da Costa Sacco (1930 – 11 February 2023) was a Brazilian botanist.

Sacco was a professor at the Federal University of Pelotas. He specialised in the genus Passiflora and named and published many species, including Passiflora edmundoi. The Brazilian botanist Armando Carlos Cervi has named Passiflora saccoi after him. Sacco died on 11 February 2023, at the age of 93.

== Selected publications ==
- 'Identificação das principais variedades de trigo do sul do Brasil'; in: Boletim técnico do Instituto Agronómico do Sul deel 26, 1960, Instituto Agronómico do Sul, Pelotas
- 'Passifloraceae', in: A.R. Schultz (ed), Flora ilustrada do Rio Grande do Sul, pp 7–29, 1962, Instituto de Ciências Naturais, Universidade Federal do Rio Grande do Sul (UFRGS), Porto Alegre
- 'Contribuição ao estudo das Passifloraceae do Brasil: Duas novas espécies de Passiflora'; In: Sellowia No. 18, 41–46, 1966
- 'Contribuição ao estudo das Passifloraceae do Brasil: Passiflora margaritae'; in: Sellowia, 19: 59–61, 1967
- 'Passifloráceas'; in: R. Reitz (ed), Flora ilustrada catarinense, pp 1–130, 1980, Herbário Barbosa Rodrigues, Itajaí, SC
- 'Passiflora castellanosii'; in: Bradea 1 (33): 346–348, 1973
- 'Una nova especie de Passiflora da Bolívia: Passiflora pilosicorona'; in: Bradea 1 (33): 349–352, 1973
