= Passiflora zamorana =

Conservation status
- Endangered (IUCN 3.1)

Scientific classification
- Kingdom: Plantae
- Clade: Tracheophytes
- Clade: Angiosperms
- Clade: Eudicots
- Clade: Rosids
- Order: Malpighiales
- Family: Passifloraceae
- Genus: Passiflora
- Species: P. zamorana

Binomial name
- Passiflora zamorana Killip

Species of vine

Passiflora zamorana is a species of plant in the family Passifloraceae. It is endemic to Ecuador.
