= Passiflora jamesonii =

Conservation status
- Vulnerable (IUCN 3.1)

Scientific classification
- Kingdom: Plantae
- Clade: Tracheophytes
- Clade: Angiosperms
- Clade: Eudicots
- Clade: Rosids
- Order: Malpighiales
- Family: Passifloraceae
- Genus: Passiflora
- Species: P. jamesonii

Binomial name
- Passiflora jamesonii (Mast.) L.H.Bailey

Synonyms
- Tacsonia jamesonii Mast.

Species of vine

Passiflora jamesonii is a species of flowering plant in the family Passifloraceae. It is native to Ecuador and Peru.
