= Passiflora ampullacea =

Conservation status
- Vulnerable (IUCN 3.1)

Scientific classification
- Kingdom: Plantae
- Clade: Tracheophytes
- Clade: Angiosperms
- Clade: Eudicots
- Clade: Rosids
- Order: Malpighiales
- Family: Passifloraceae
- Genus: Passiflora
- Species: P. ampullacea

Binomial name
- Passiflora ampullacea (Mast.) Harms

Synonyms
- Homotypic Synonyms: Tacsonia ampullacea Mast.; Heterotypic Synonyms: Passiflora hieronymi Harms

Species of vine

Passiflora ampullacea is a species of flowering plant in the family Passifloraceae. The vine is endemic to Ecuador. It is an IUCN Red List threatened species.
