= Linda Katherine Escobar =

American botanist (1940–1993)

- Born: August 14, 1940; Columbus
- Died: December 15, 1993 (aged 53); La Mesa
- Education: University of New Hampshire
- Alma mater: Purdue University
- Known for: Her study of Passiflora
- Scientific career
- Fields: Botany, plant collecting, and education
- Institutions: University of Antioquia
- Thesis: (1980)
- Author abbrev. (botany): L.K.Escobar

Linda Katherine Albert de Escobar (born 14 August 1940, Columbus, died 15 December 1993, La Mesa), was an American botanist, plant collector, and educator noted for her study of Passiflora as well as her work as a teacher and administrator at the University of Antioquia. She was director of the university's herbarium from 1981 to 1988, and served as President of the Herbariums Colombian Association. The species Passiflora linda was named in her honor. The standard author abbreviation L.K.Escobar is used to indicate this person as the author when citing a botanical name. She identified over forty species, mostly in Passiflora.

== Education ==
Escobar received her undergraduate degree in biology at University of New Hampshire (B.Sc., 1962), her master's from Purdue University (M.Sc., 1971), and her doctorate from the University of Texas at Austin (Ph.D., 1980). While at Purdue, she studied under the direction of ecologist Alton A. Lindsey.

== Selected works ==
- Escobar, Linda Katherine (1988). Flora de Colombia. T. 10 Passifloraceae. Univ. Nacional de Colombia.
- Escobar, Linda Katherine (1988). Passifloraceae. Instituto de ciencias naturales - Museo de historia natural.
- Escobar, Linda Katherine (1981). Interrelationships of the edible species of Passiflora centering around Passiflora mollissima (H.B.K.) Bailey subgenus Tacsonia. University Microfilms.
- Escobar, Linda K. (1976). Beech-Maple region.
- Escobar, Linda K. (1994). "Two New Species and a Key to Passiflora subg. Astrophea". Systematic Botany. 19 (2): 203–210. doi:10.2307/2419596. ISSN 0363-6445. JSTOR 2419596.
- Escobar, Linda K. (1992). "Passiflora brachyantha (Passifloraceae), a New Species from the Andes of Southern Ecuador". Novon. 2 (3): 198–200. doi:10.2307/3391547. ISSN 1055-3177. JSTOR 3391547.
