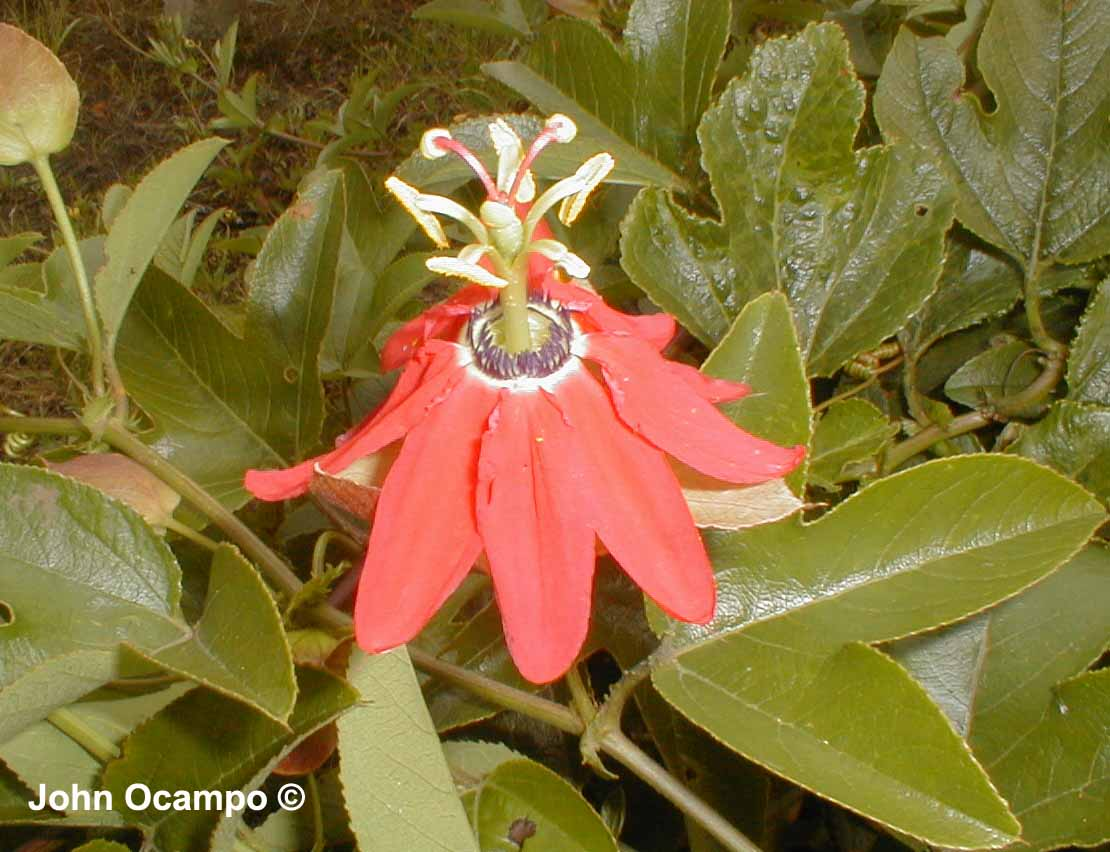

Scientific classification
- Kingdom: Plantae
- Clade: Tracheophytes
- Clade: Angiosperms
- Clade: Eudicots
- Clade: Rosids
- Order: Malpighiales
- Family: Passifloraceae
- Genus: Passiflora
- Species: P. manicata

Binomial name
- Passiflora manicata (Juss.) Pers 1806

= Passiflora manicata =

Species of vine

Passiflora manicata is a species of Passiflora from Colombia and Ecuador.
