= Rivetina syriaca =

Scientific classification
- Kingdom: Animalia
- Phylum: Arthropoda
- Clade: Pancrustacea
- Class: Insecta
- Order: Mantodea
- Family: Rivetinidae
- Genus: Rivetina
- Species: R. syriaca

Binomial name
- Rivetina syriaca Saussure, 1869

Species of praying mantis

Rivetina syriaca is a species of praying mantis in the family Rivetinidae.

== See also ==
- List of mantis genera and species
