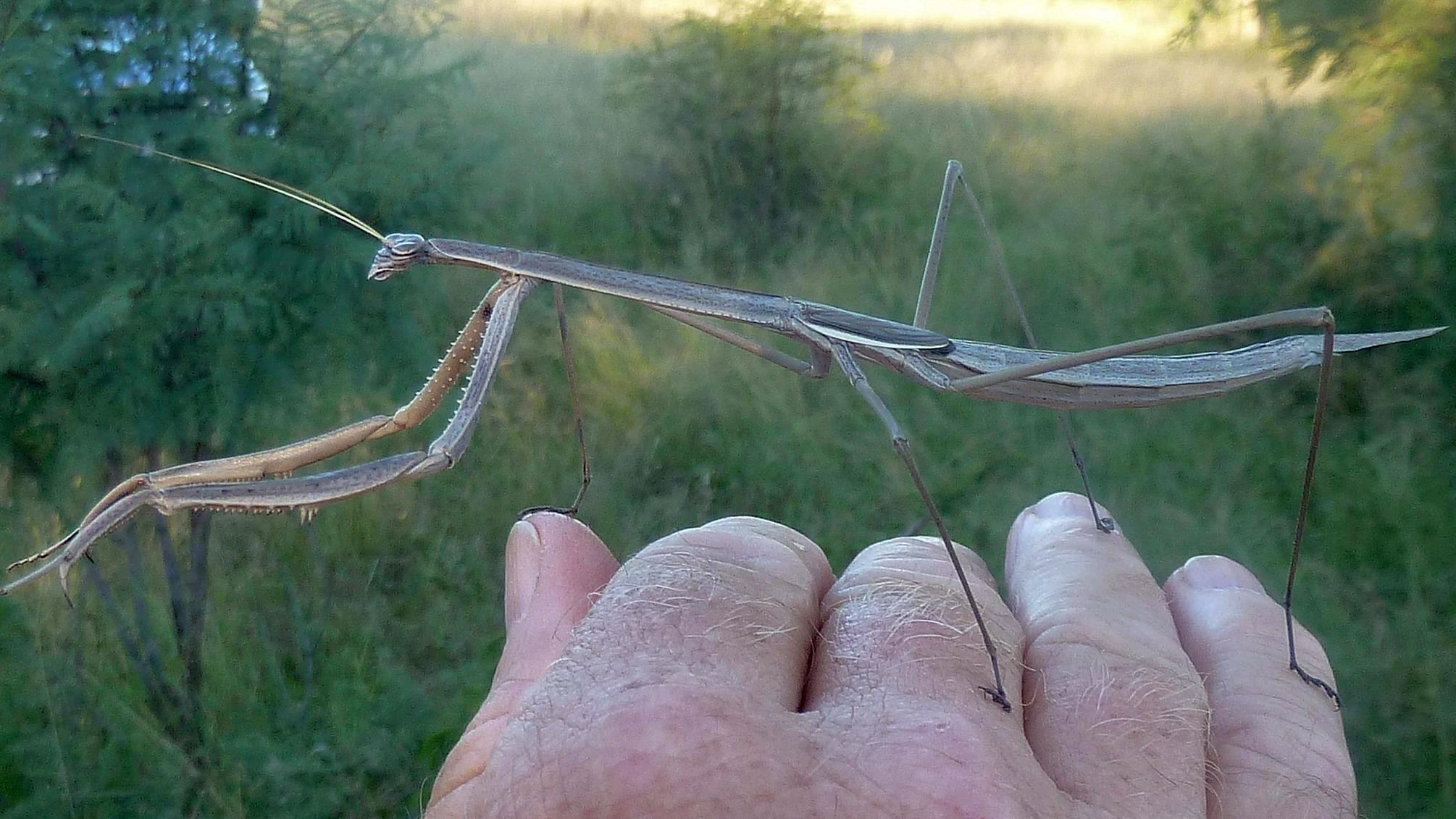

Scientific classification
- Kingdom: Animalia
- Phylum: Arthropoda
- Clade: Pancrustacea
- Class: Insecta
- Order: Mantodea
- Family: Rivetinidae
- Genus: Ischnomantis
- Species: I. fatiloqua

Binomial name
- Ischnomantis fatiloqua Stål, 1856

= Ischnomantis fatiloqua =

Species of mantis

Ischnomantis fatiloqua is a species of mantis from the family Rivetinidae native to Africa.

== See also ==
- List of mantis genera and species
