= Rivetina rhombicollis =

Scientific classification
- Domain: Eukaryota
- Kingdom: Animalia
- Phylum: Arthropoda
- Class: Insecta
- Order: Mantodea
- Family: Rivetinidae
- Genus: Rivetina
- Species: R. rhombicollis

Binomial name
- Rivetina rhombicollis La Greca & Lombardo, 1982

Species of praying mantis

Rivetina rhombicollis is a species of praying mantis in the family Rivetinidae.

== See also ==
- List of mantis genera and species
