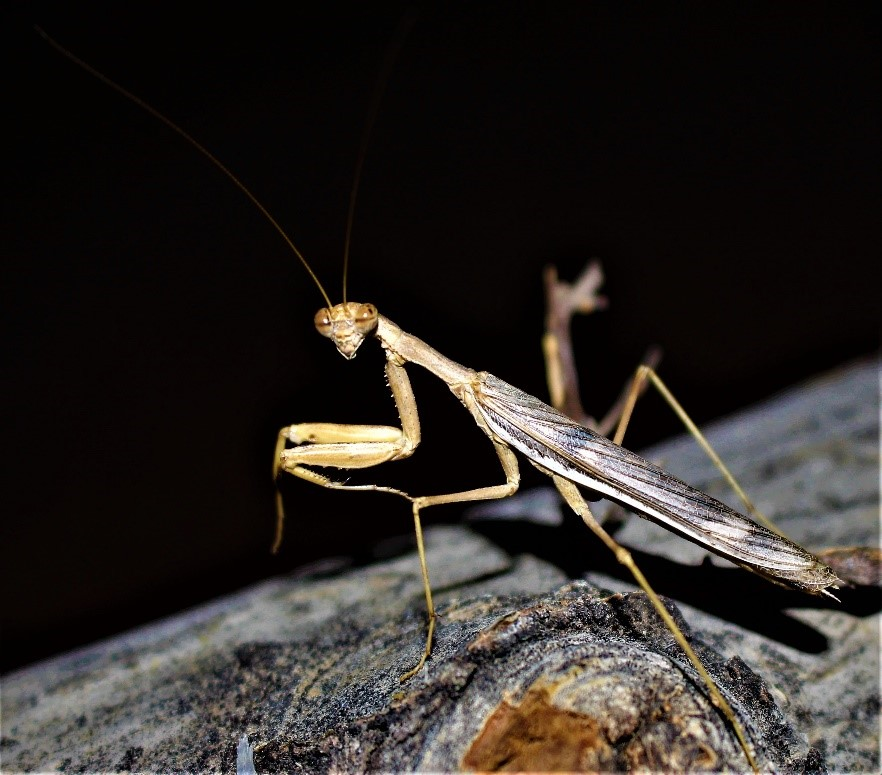
- Rivetina caucasica, Iran

Scientific classification
- Kingdom: Animalia
- Phylum: Arthropoda
- Clade: Pancrustacea
- Class: Insecta
- Order: Mantodea
- Family: Rivetinidae
- Genus: Rivetina
- Species: R. caucasica

Binomial name
- Rivetina caucasica Saussure, 1871

= Rivetina caucasica =

Species of praying mantis

Rivetina caucasica is a species of praying mantis in the family Rivetinidae.

It is found in the Caucasus region.

== See also ==
- List of mantis genera and species
