= Rivetina inermis =

Scientific classification
- Domain: Eukaryota
- Kingdom: Animalia
- Phylum: Arthropoda
- Class: Insecta
- Order: Mantodea
- Family: Rivetinidae
- Genus: Rivetina
- Species: R. inermis

Binomial name
- Rivetina inermis (Uvarov, 1922)

Synonyms
- Fischeria inermis Uvarov, 1923

Species of praying mantis

Rivetina inermis is a species of praying mantis in the family Rivetinidae. There are two subspecies: R. i. inermis and R. i. iranica. It is found in Iran, Saudi Arabia, and Yemen. It was originally described in the genus Fischeria in 1923 by Boris Uvarov from a male specimen found in Arabia.

== See also ==
- List of mantis genera and species
