= R. nana =

R. nana may refer to:

- Rivetina nana, a praying mantis species
- Ravenea nana, a flowering plant species found only in Madagascar

== See also ==
- Nana (disambiguation)
