= Rivetina byblica =

Scientific classification
- Kingdom: Animalia
- Phylum: Arthropoda
- Clade: Pancrustacea
- Class: Insecta
- Order: Mantodea
- Family: Rivetinidae
- Genus: Rivetina
- Species: R. byblica

Binomial name
- Rivetina byblica La Greca & Lombardo, 1982

Species of praying mantis

Rivetina byblica is a species of praying mantis in the family Rivetinidae.

== See also ==
- List of mantis genera and species
