= Rivetina asiatica =

Scientific classification
- Kingdom: Animalia
- Phylum: Arthropoda
- Clade: Pancrustacea
- Class: Insecta
- Order: Mantodea
- Family: Rivetinidae
- Genus: Rivetina
- Species: R. asiatica

Binomial name
- Rivetina asiatica Mistshenko, 1967

Synonyms
- Rivetina Kinzelbachia kinzelbachi (Harz, 1988)

Species of praying mantis

Rivetina asiatica is a species of praying mantis in the family Rivetinidae, native to western Asia.

The insect is endemic to Asian Turkey.

== See also ==
- List of mantis genera and species
- Mantises of Asia
