= Rivetina beybienkoi =

Scientific classification
- Domain: Eukaryota
- Kingdom: Animalia
- Phylum: Arthropoda
- Class: Insecta
- Order: Mantodea
- Family: Rivetinidae
- Genus: Rivetina
- Species: R. beybienkoi

Binomial name
- Rivetina beybienkoi Lindt, 1961

Subspecies
- R. b. baldzhunaica Lindt, 1960; R. b. beybienkoi Lindt, 1961; R. b. meridionale Lindt, 1980

Species of praying mantis

Rivetina beybienkoi is a species of praying mantis in the family Rivetinidae.

== See also ==
- List of mantis genera and species
