= Deiphobe =

Deiphobe may refer to

- Cumaean Sibyl, an ancient Greek priestess
- Deiphobe (mantis), a genus of insects

== See also ==
- Deiphobus, a son of Priam and Hecuba in Greek mythology
