= Ischnomantis gigas =

Scientific classification
- Kingdom: Animalia
- Phylum: Arthropoda
- Clade: Pancrustacea
- Class: Insecta
- Order: Mantodea
- Family: Rivetinidae
- Genus: Ischnomantis
- Species: I. gigas

Binomial name
- Ischnomantis gigas Saussure, 1870

Species of mantis

Ischnomantis gigas is a species of mantis from the family Rivetinidae native to Africa. It is one of the longest species of mantis, being able to reach lengths of over 17 cm. However, it is more gracile in build than other large mantises.

== See also ==
- List of mantis genera and species
