= Rivetina elegans =

Scientific classification
- Domain: Eukaryota
- Kingdom: Animalia
- Phylum: Arthropoda
- Class: Insecta
- Order: Mantodea
- Family: Rivetinidae
- Genus: Rivetina
- Species: R. elegans

Binomial name
- Rivetina elegans Mistshemko, 1967

Species of praying mantis

Rivetina elegans is a type of species of praying mantis in the family Rivetinidae.

== See also ==
- List of mantis genera and species
