= Deiphobe mesomelas =

Scientific classification
- Kingdom: Animalia
- Phylum: Arthropoda
- Clade: Pancrustacea
- Class: Insecta
- Order: Mantodea
- Family: Rivetinidae
- Subfamily: Deiphobinae
- Genus: Deiphobe
- Species: D. mesomelas

Binomial name
- Deiphobe mesomelas Olivier, 1792

Synonyms
- Deiphobe robusta (Kirby, 1904); Deiphobe incisa Uvarov, 1933; Deiphobe yunnanensis Tinkham, 1937

Species of praying mantis

Deiphobe mesomelas is an Asian species of praying mantis in the family Rivetinidae. There are no subspecies for this species listed in the Catalogue of Life.
