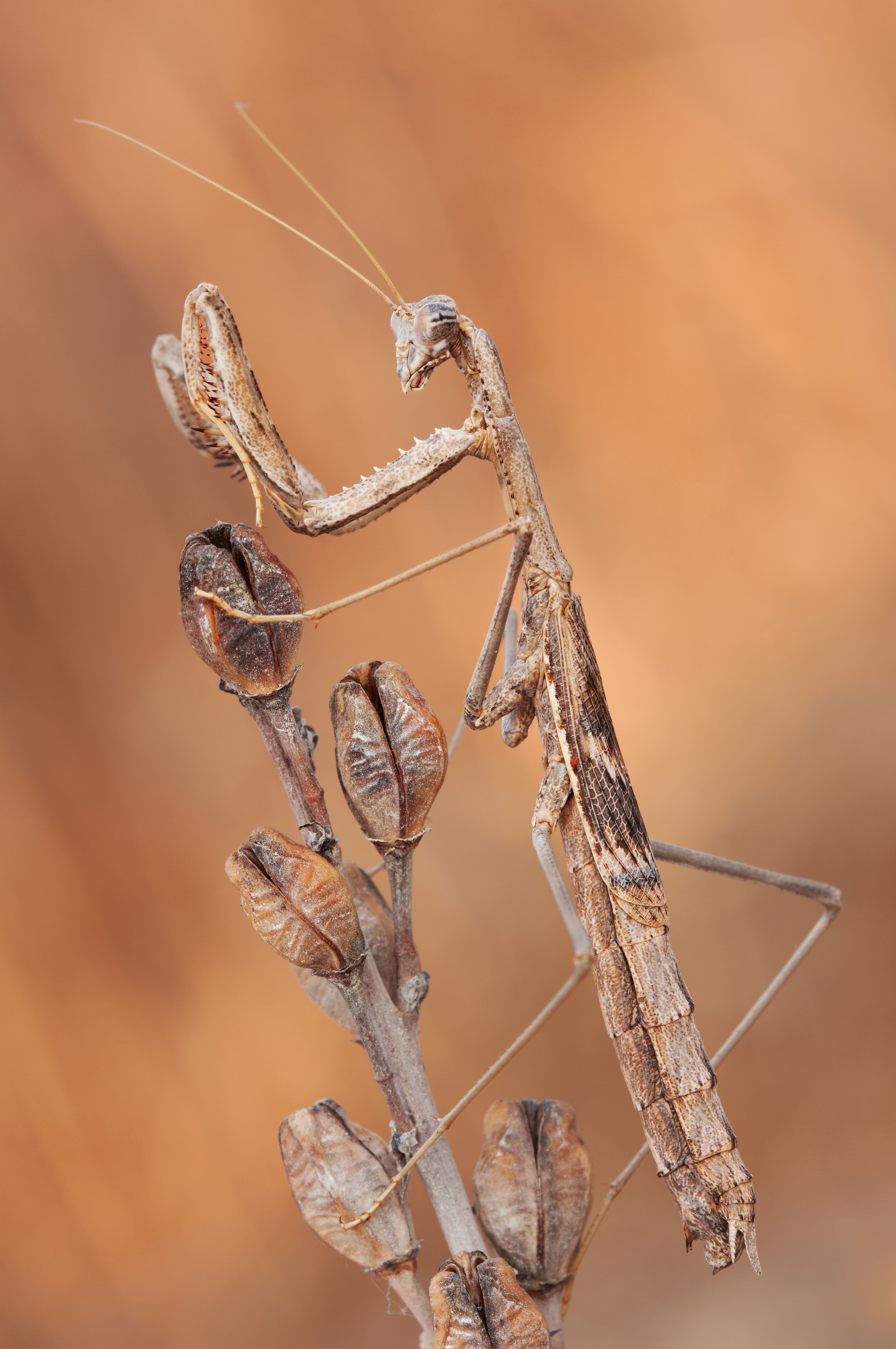

Conservation status
- Data Deficient (IUCN 3.1)

Scientific classification
- Kingdom: Animalia
- Phylum: Arthropoda
- Class: Insecta
- Order: Mantodea
- Family: Rivetinidae
- Genus: Rivetina
- Species: R. baetica

Binomial name
- Rivetina baetica Rambur, 1839

Subspecies
- R. b. baetica Rambur, 1839; R. b. balcanica Kaltenbach, 1963; R. b. tenuidentata La Greca & Lombardo, 1982
- Range of Rivetina baetica Extant (resident)

Synonyms
- List: Eufishceriella baetica Giglio-Tos, 1927; Fischeria baetica (Rambur, 1838); Iris syriaca Saussure, 1869; Iris (Fischeria) baetica (Rambur, 1838); Mantis baetica Rambur, 1839; Mantis fasciata Thunberg, 1815; Mantis maculipennis Gistel, 1856; Mantis pallasii Fieber, 1853

= Rivetina baetica =

Species of praying mantis

Rivetina baetica, commonly known as the Baetic ground mantis, is a species of praying mantis in the family Rivetinidae.

== Description ==
The Baetic ground mantis is a camouflaged, slightly ruddy, greyish-brown species, with large, prominent eyes. It antennae, which are shorter than its body, are yellowish. Males' antennae are far thicker than females'.

== Distribution ==
The Baetic ground mantis is found around the Mediterranean basin, in North Africa and Southern Europe, and in parts eastwards: in Iran, southern Russia, and Central Asia.

== Habitat ==
They are found in steppe areas dominated by Artemesia, in rocky places, and in sparse drought-resistant shrublands, or shibliak.

== Taxonomy ==
The species has a complicated taxonomic history.

Rivetina baetica was first classified as Mantis bætica when a French entomologist, Jules Pierre Rambur, described it from Andalusia near Málaga in 1839. Next, the species was moved to the genus Iris, subgenus Fischeria by Henri de Saussure in 1869; Fischeria was later raised to full genus level. In 1916, Ermanno Giglio-Tos identified that Fischeria baetica was the same species as a previously (and incompletely) described species, Mantis fasciata; he gave the latter taxon priority in his synonymy. Finally, in 1922, Lucien Berland and Lucien Chopard renamed Saussure's genus – Fischeria – Rivetina, since Fischeria shared its name with a fly genus. The same year, Giglio-Tos sent a work classifying the two species he had identified as the same, baetica and fasciata, into his own new genus Eufishceriella, to his publishers. However, the work's publication was delayed to 1927, so the genus name Rivetina remains valid due to its greater age.

== See also ==
- List of mantis genera and species
