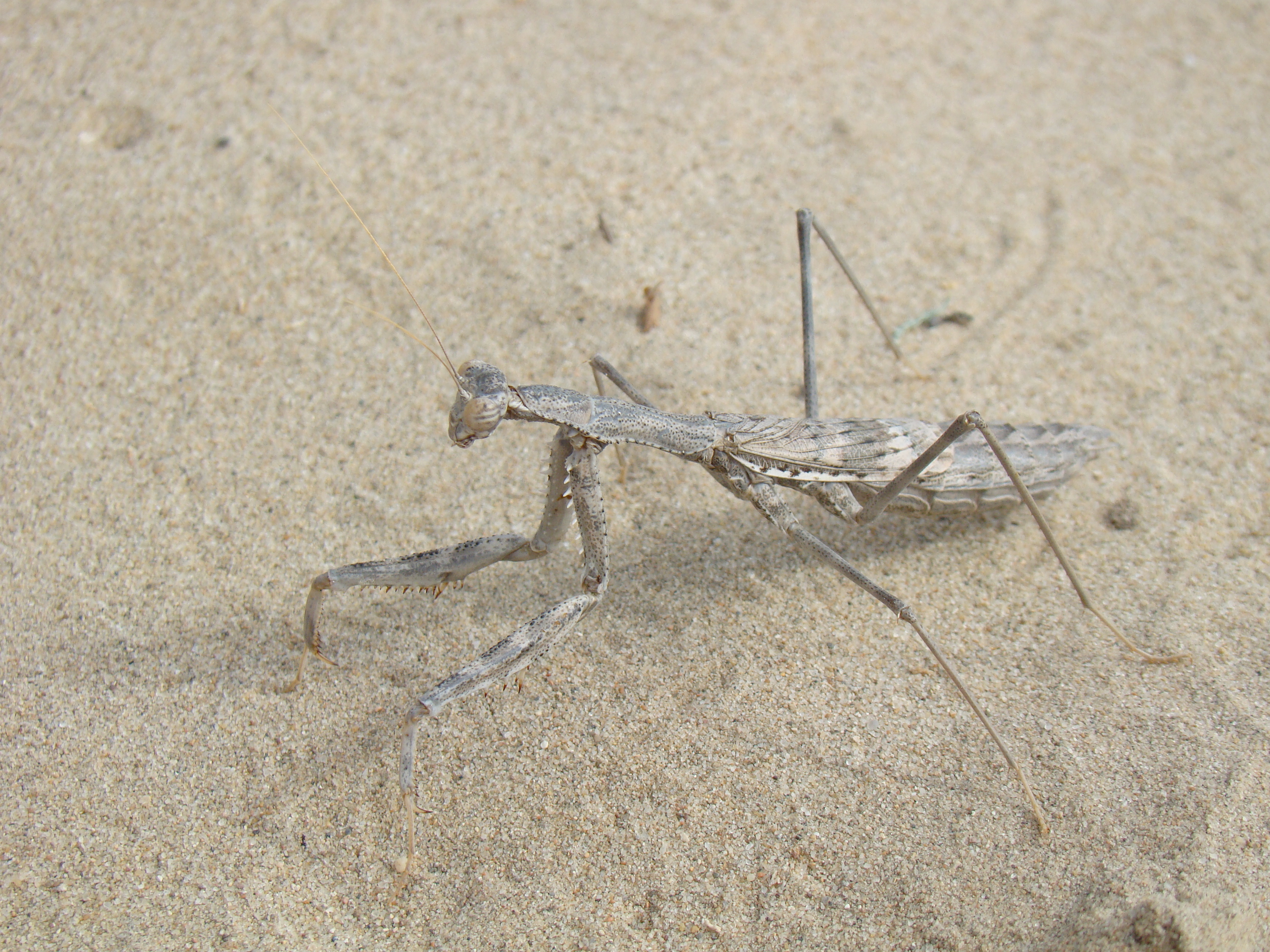
- From Baikonur, Kazakhstan

Conservation status
- Data Deficient (IUCN 3.1)

Scientific classification
- Kingdom: Animalia
- Phylum: Arthropoda
- Clade: Pancrustacea
- Class: Insecta
- Order: Mantodea
- Family: Rivetinidae
- Genus: Bolivaria
- Species: B. brachyptera

Binomial name
- Bolivaria brachyptera Pallas, 1773

= Bolivaria brachyptera =

Species of mantis

Bolivaria brachyptera, also known as Bolivar's short winged mantis, is a species of mantis from the family Rivetinidae native to Central and Western Asia, as well as Crimea and Greece.

== Gallery ==
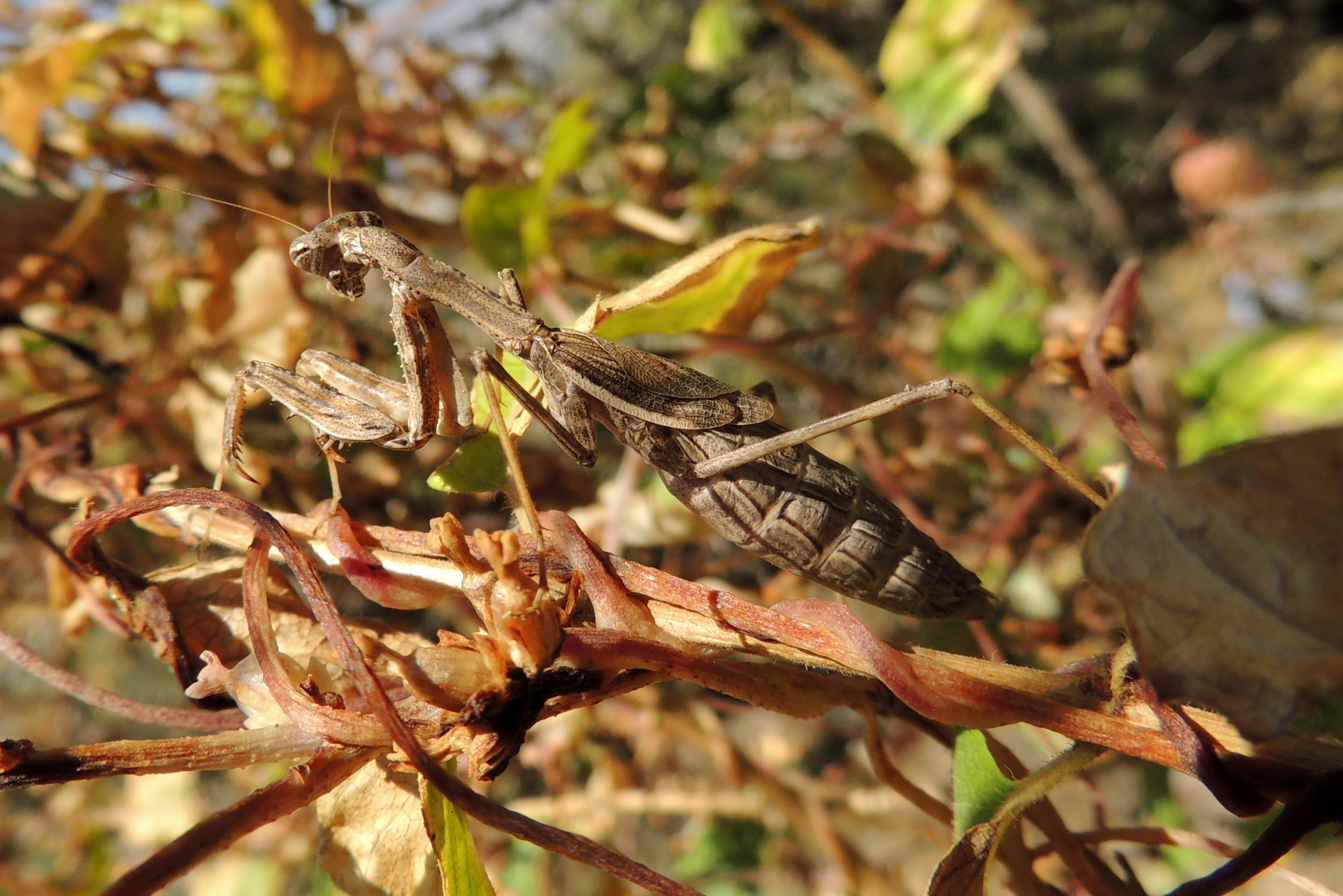

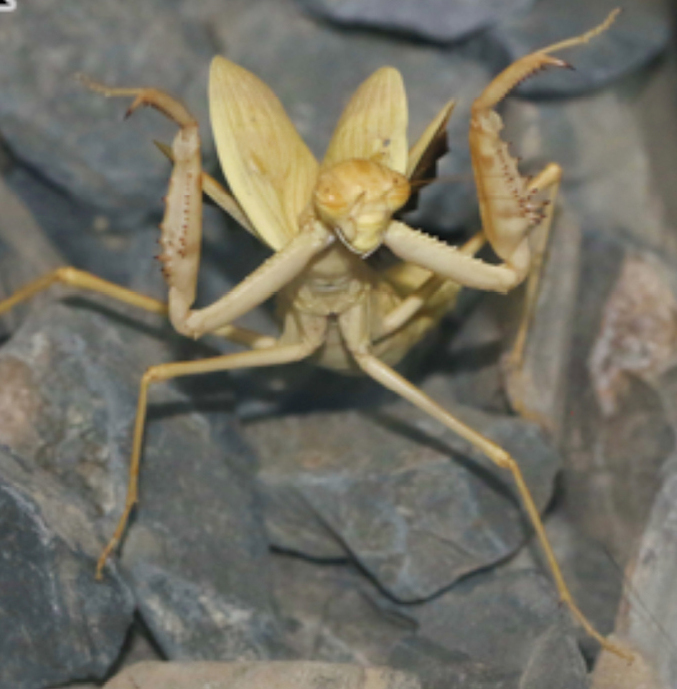

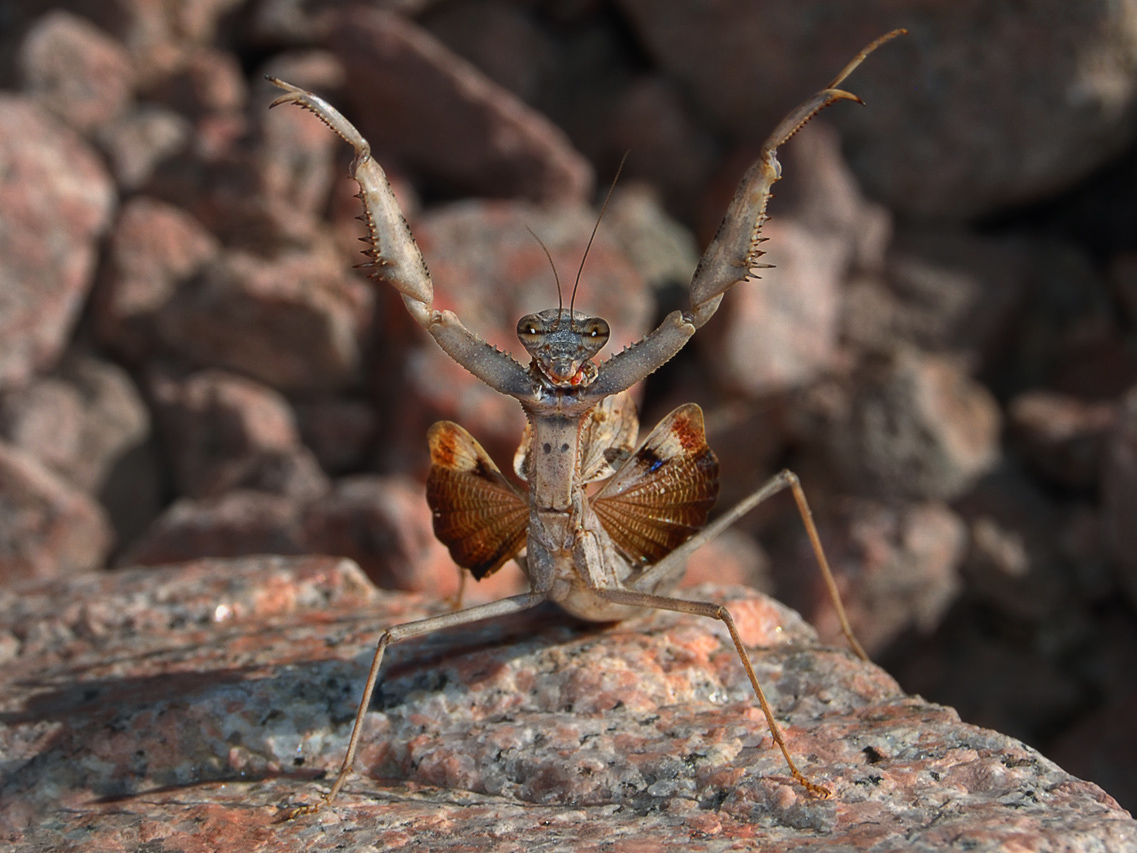

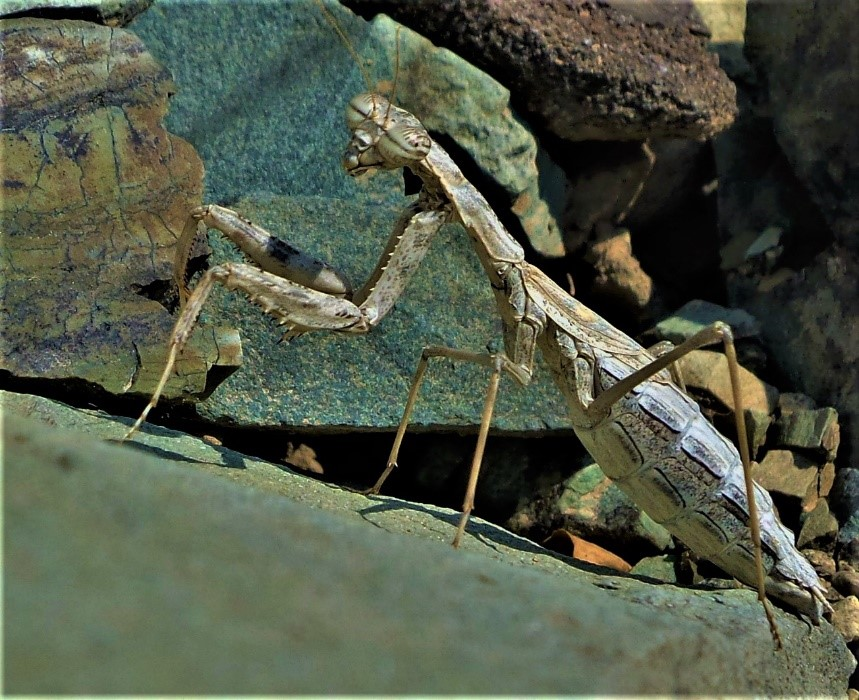

== See also ==
- List of mantis genera and species
