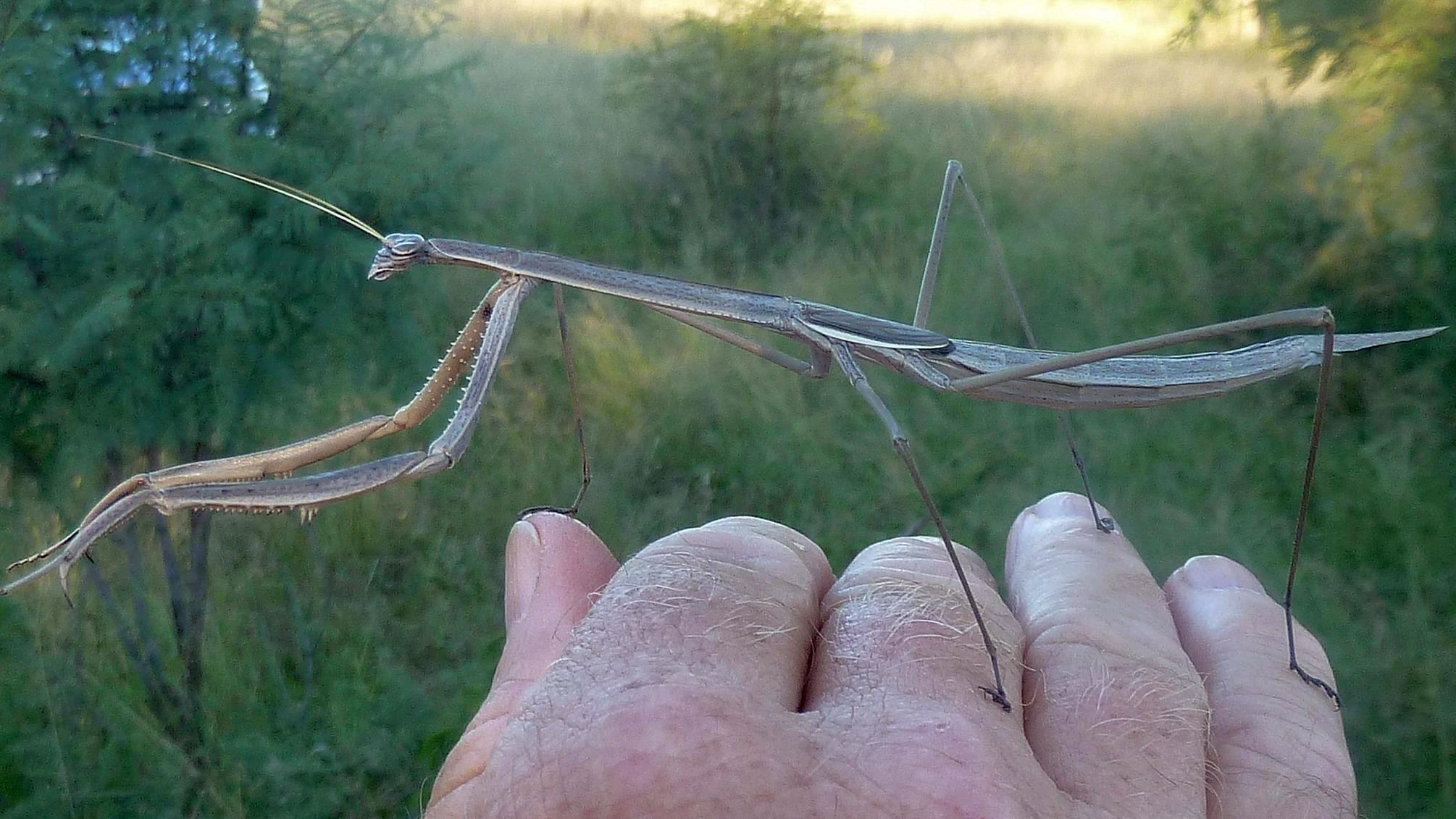
- Ischnomantis fatiloqua

Scientific classification
- Kingdom: Animalia
- Phylum: Arthropoda
- Clade: Pancrustacea
- Class: Insecta
- Order: Mantodea
- Family: Rivetinidae
- Tribe: Ischnomantini
- Genus: Ischnomantis; Stål 1871

Type species
- Ischnomantis fatiloqua Stål, 1856

= Ischnomantis =

Genus of mantis

Ischnomantis is a genus of mantis native to Africa.

== Species ==
- Ischnomantis aethiopica Giglio-Tos, 1916
- Ischnomantis fasciata Giglio-Tos, 1916
- Ischnomantis fatiloqua Stål, 1856
- Ischnomantis flavescens Chopard, 1940
- Ischnomantis gigas Saussure, 1870
- Ischnomantis gracilis Giglio-Tos, 1916
- Ischnomantis grandis Saussure, 1869
- Ischnomantis media Rehn, 1901
- Ischnomantis perfida Guerin-Meneville, 1849
- Ischnomantis spinigera Schulthess-Schindler, 1898
- Ischnomantis usambarica Sjostedt, 1909
- Ischnomantis werneri Giglio-Tos, 1916
