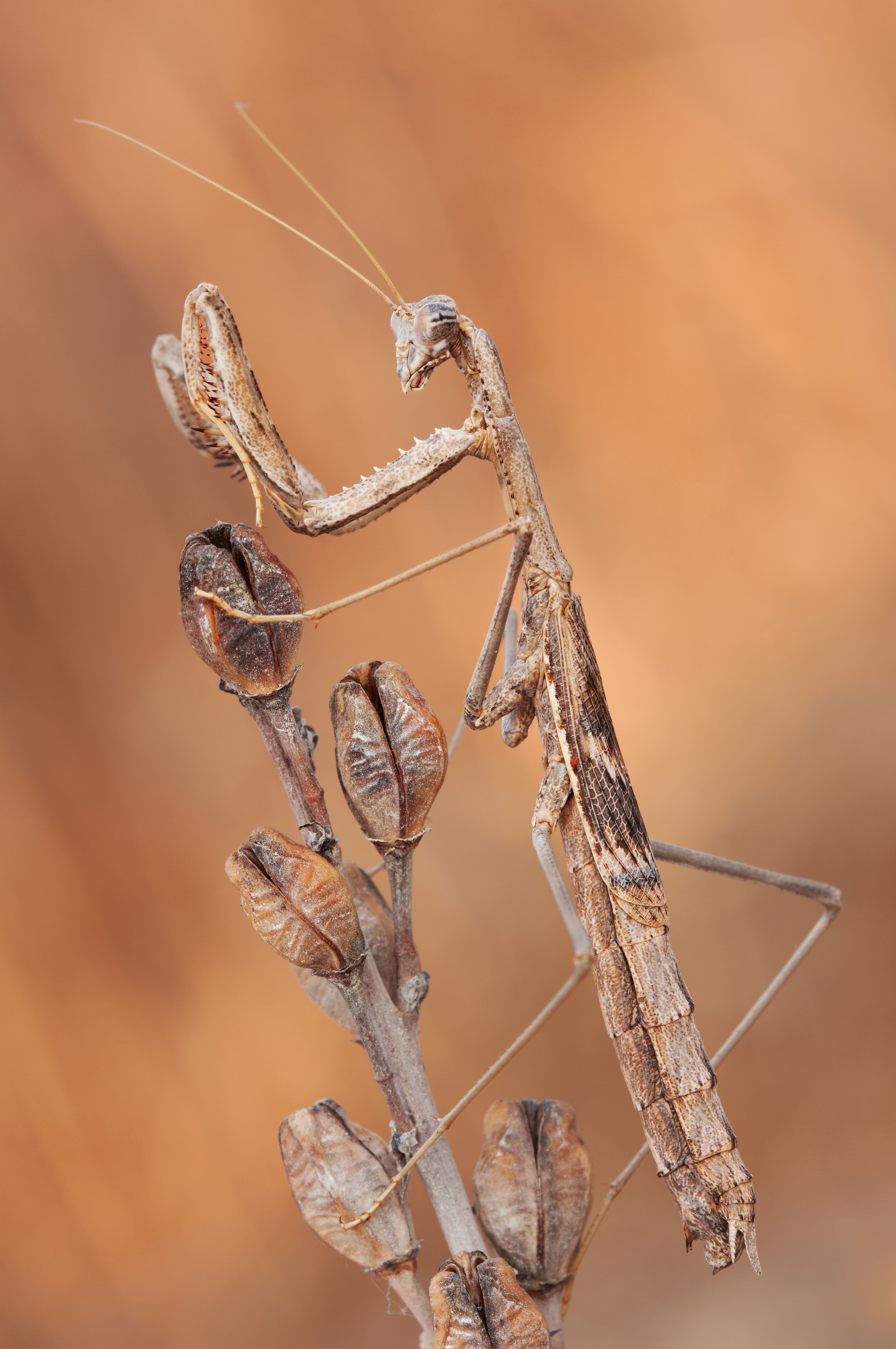
- Rivetina baetica (ground mantis)
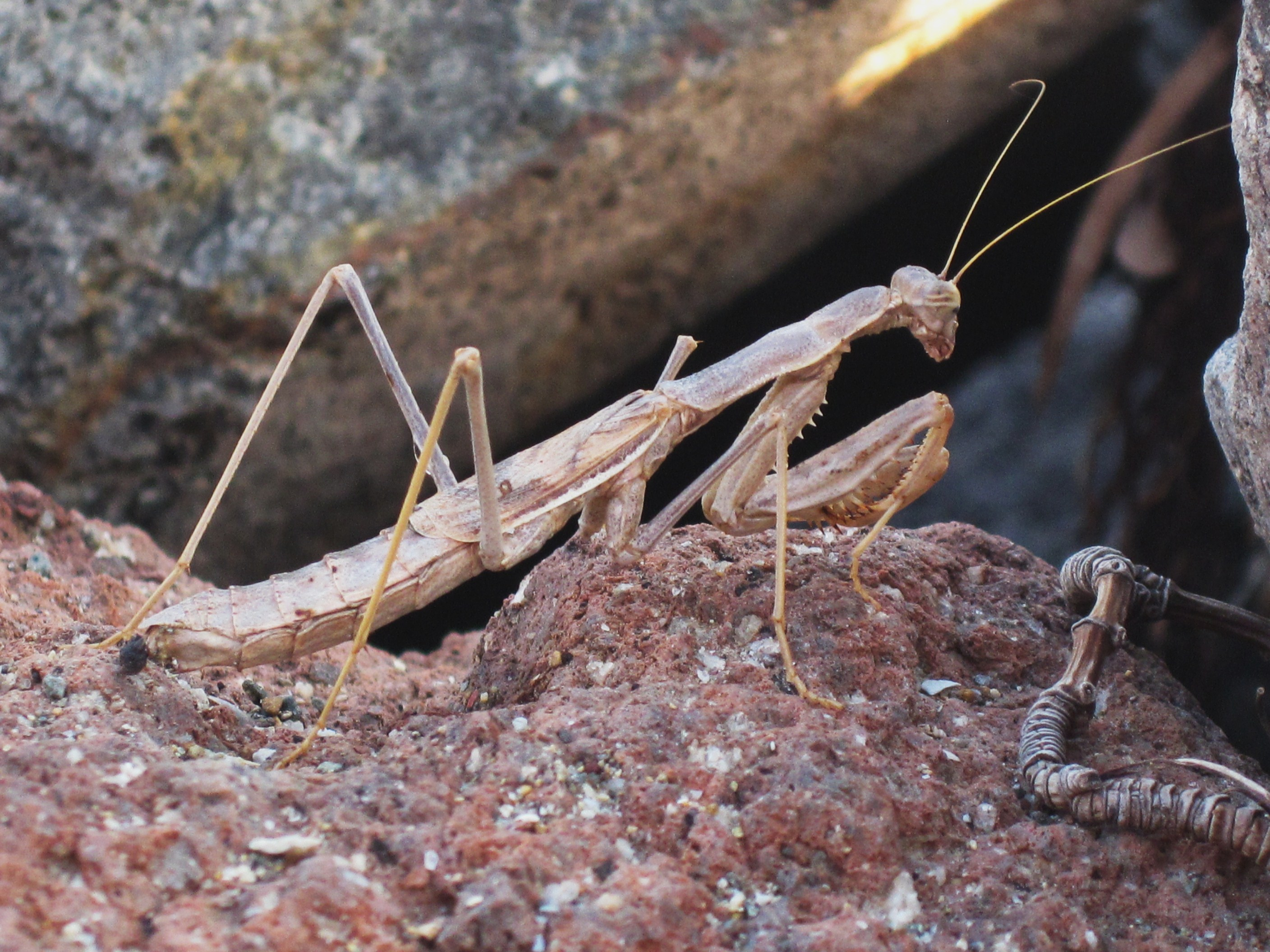
- A female Rivetina balcanica from the island of Lesbos, Greece.

Scientific classification
- Kingdom: Animalia
- Phylum: Arthropoda
- Clade: Pancrustacea
- Class: Insecta
- Order: Mantodea
- Family: Rivetinidae
- Subfamily: Rivetininae
- Genus: Rivetina; Berland & Chopard, 1922

Species
- see text

= Rivetina =

Genus of praying mantises

Rivetina is a genus of praying mantises that belongs to the family Rivetinidae. This genus is native to Europe, Asia and Africa.

== Distribution ==
Distribution map of Rivetina baetica (ground mantis) showing where many species of this genus inhabit.

Members of this genus can be found in northwestern Africa and southern Europe in regions such as the Iberian Peninsula. Many species can also be found in the Middle East and Central Asia including Pakistan and Tajikistan. Around eight species and subspecies have been recorded in Iran although many are doubtful due to the sightings substantial geographic separation between the known distribution range and their sightings in Iran.

They are a ground-dwelling species often being found in hot and dry environments (xerothermic). They can be seen sheltering beneath stones.

== Description ==
Most species have a uniform brown or pale coloration, never being found to be green, to match their ground-dwelling xerothermic habitats. They are able to run rapidly on the ground.

== Taxonomy ==
This genus was established in 1922 by Lucien Berland and Lucien Chopard, both French entomologists and arachnologist.

=== Species ===
The following species are recognised in the genus Rivetina:

- Rivetina asiatica Mistshenko, 1967
- Rivetina archibaldi Kolnegari, Handal & Khormizi, 2026
- Rivetina baetica Rambur, 1839 (Ground Mantis)
- Rivetina balcanica Kaltenbach, 1963
- Rivetina beybienkoi Lindt, 1961
- Rivetina buettikeri Kaltenbach, 1982
- Rivetina byblica La Greca & Lombardo, 1982
- Rivetina caucasica Saussure, 1871
- Rivetina compacta Lindt, 1980
- Rivetina crassa Mistshenko, 1949
- Rivetina dentata Mistshenko, 1967
- Rivetina deserta Mistshenko, 1967
- Rivetina dolichoptera Schulthess, 1894
- Rivetina elegans Mistshemko, 1967
- Rivetina excellens La Greca & Lombardo, 1982
- Rivetina fasciata Thunberg, 1815
- Rivetina feisabadica Lindt, 1961
- Rivetina gigantea Kaltenbach, 1991
- Rivetina gigas Saussure, 1871
- Rivetina grandis Saussure, 1872
- Rivetina inermis Uvarov, 1922
- Rivetina iranica La Greca & Lombardo, 1982
- Rivetina karadumi Lindt, 1961
- Rivetina karateginica Lindt, 1961
- Rivetina laticollis La Greca & Lombardo, 1982
- Rivetina monticola Mistshenko, 1956
- Rivetina nana Mistshenko, 1967
- Rivetina pallida Kaltenbach, 1984
- Rivetina parva Lindt, 1980
- Rivetina pulisangini Lindt, 1968
- Rivetina rhombicollis La Greca & Lombardo, 1982
- Rivetina similis Lindt, 1980
- Rivetina syriaca Saussure, 1869
- Rivetina tarda Lindt, 1980
- Rivetina varsobica Lindt, 1968

== See also ==
- Ground Mantis
- List of mantis genera and species
- Mantises by location
