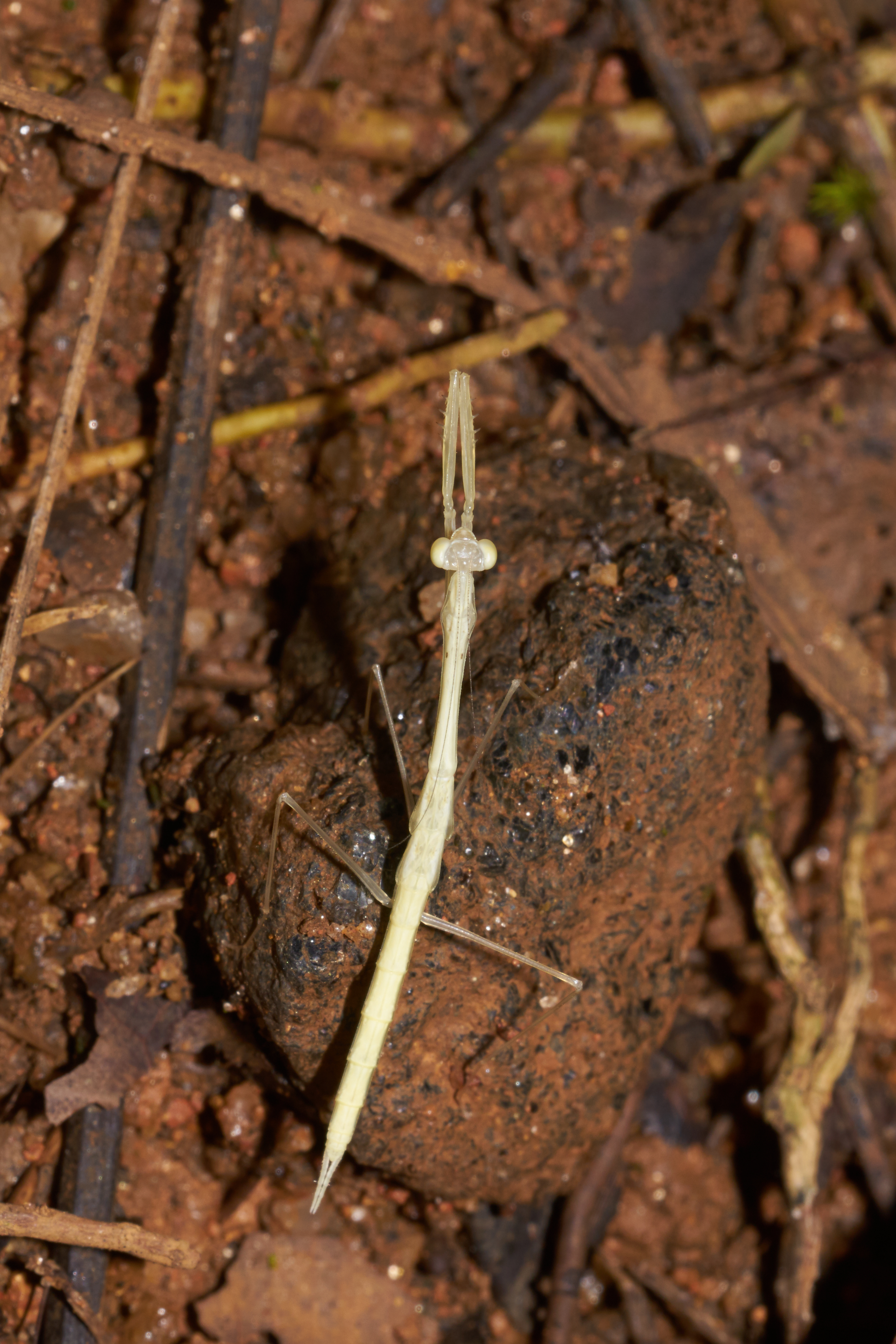
- Deiphobe sp., India

Scientific classification
- Kingdom: Animalia
- Phylum: Arthropoda
- Clade: Pancrustacea
- Class: Insecta
- Order: Mantodea
- Family: Rivetinidae
- Subfamily: Deiphobinae
- Genus: Deiphobe; Stal, 1877

Synonyms
- Sphendale Stal, 1877

= Deiphobe (mantis) =

Genus of praying mantises

Deiphobe is an Asian genus of praying mantids: in the family Rivetinidae.

== Species ==
The Mantodea Species File lists:

- Deiphobe australiana Giglio-Tos, 1916;
- Deiphobe brevipennis Sjostedt, 1930;
- Deiphobe brunneri Saussure, 1871;
- Deiphobe infuscata Saussure, 1870;
- Deiphobe longipes Werner, 1926;
- Deiphobe mesomelas Olivier, 1792 (synonyms D. incisa, D. robusta, D. yunnanensis);
- Deiphobe moseri (Saussure, 1871);
- Deiphobe xanthoptera (Olivier, 1792).
