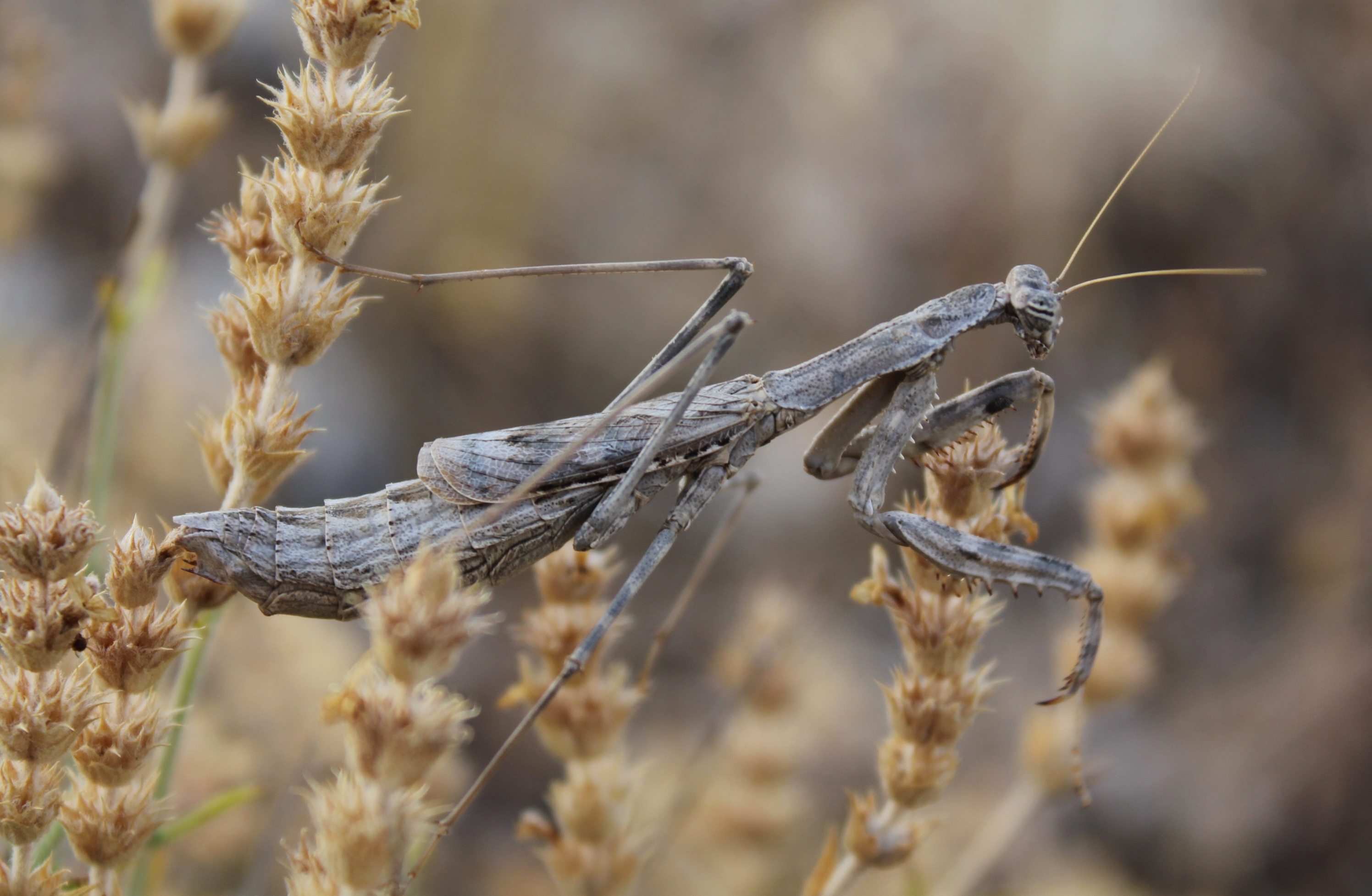
- Rivetina baetica

Scientific classification
- Kingdom: Animalia
- Phylum: Arthropoda
- Clade: Pancrustacea
- Class: Insecta
- Superorder: Dictyoptera
- Order: Mantodea
- Family: Rivetinidae; Schwarz & Roy, 2019

= Rivetinidae =

Family of praying mantises

The Rivetinidae are a family of praying mantids, based on the type genus Rivetina. As part of a major revision of mantid taxonomy, this family contains many genera moved from Miomantinae: tribe Rivetinini; some genera previously placed there have now been moved to the new families Deroplatyidae and Chroicopteridae. The new placement of this taxon is in the superfamily Eremiaphiloidea (of group Cernomantodea) and infraorder Schizomantodea.

== Distribution ==
Genera in this family have been recorded from: southern Europe, Africa and Asia. The species of this family present in Italy are Geomantis larvoides and Rivetina baetica.

== Subfamilies, tribes and genera ==
The Mantodea Species File lists two subfamilies:

=== Deiphobinae ===
tribe Cotigaonopsini

- Cotigaonopsis Vyjayandi, 2009 – monotypic C. providenceae Vyjayandi, 2009

tribe Deiphobini

- Deiphobe Stål, 1877
- Deiphobella Giglio-Tos, 1916
- Indothespis Werner, 1935

=== Rivetininae ===
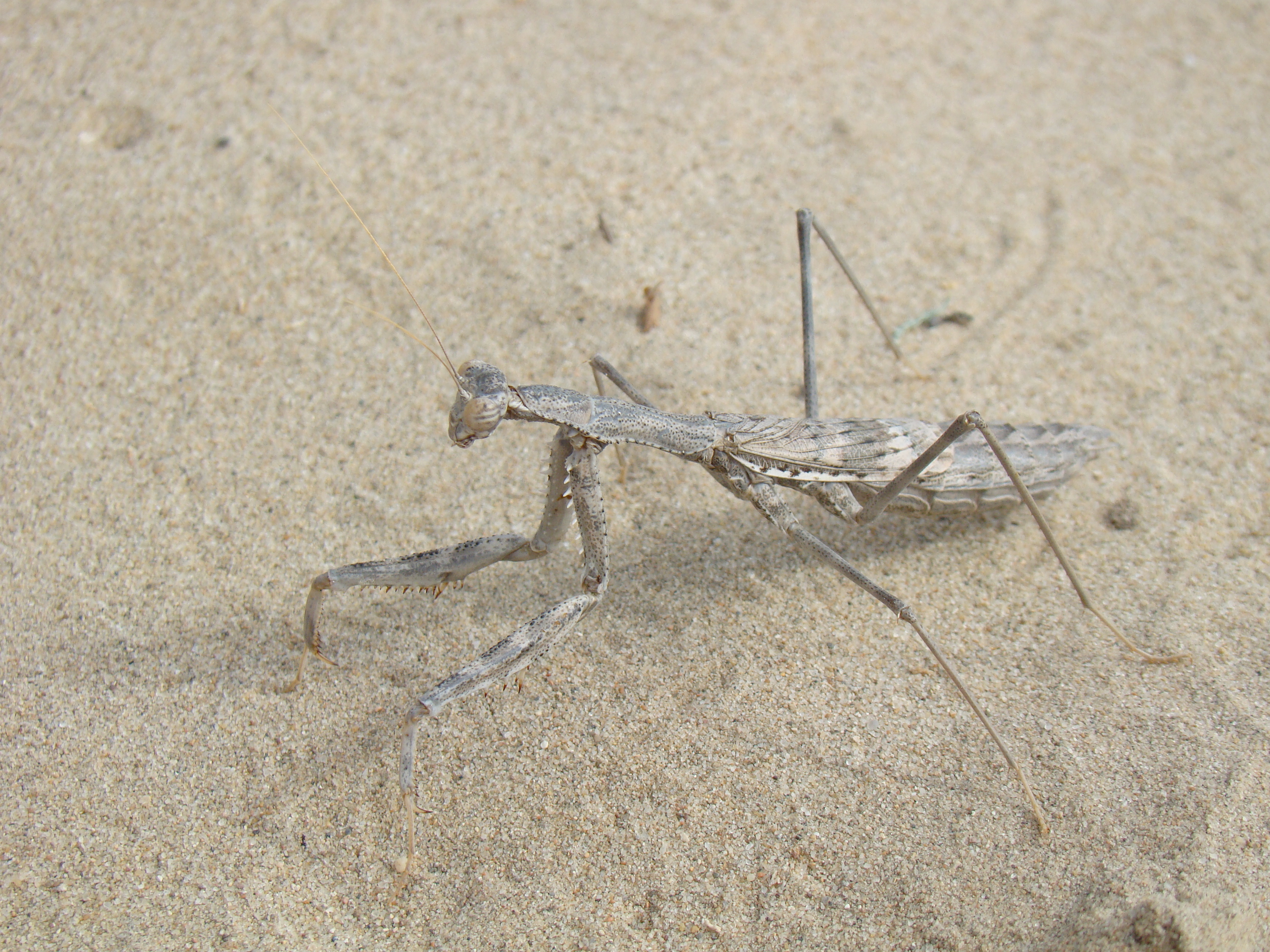
Adult female Bolivaria brachyptera from Baikonur, Kazakhstan.

tribe Ischnomantini

- Eremoplana Stål, 1871
- Ischnomantis Stål, 1871

tribe Rivetinini

- Bolivaria Stål, 1877
- Geomantis Pantel, 1896
- Microthespis Werner, 1908
- Pararivetina Beier, 1930
- Rivetina Berland & Chopard, 1922
- Rivetinula La Greca, 1977
- Teddia Burr, 1899
