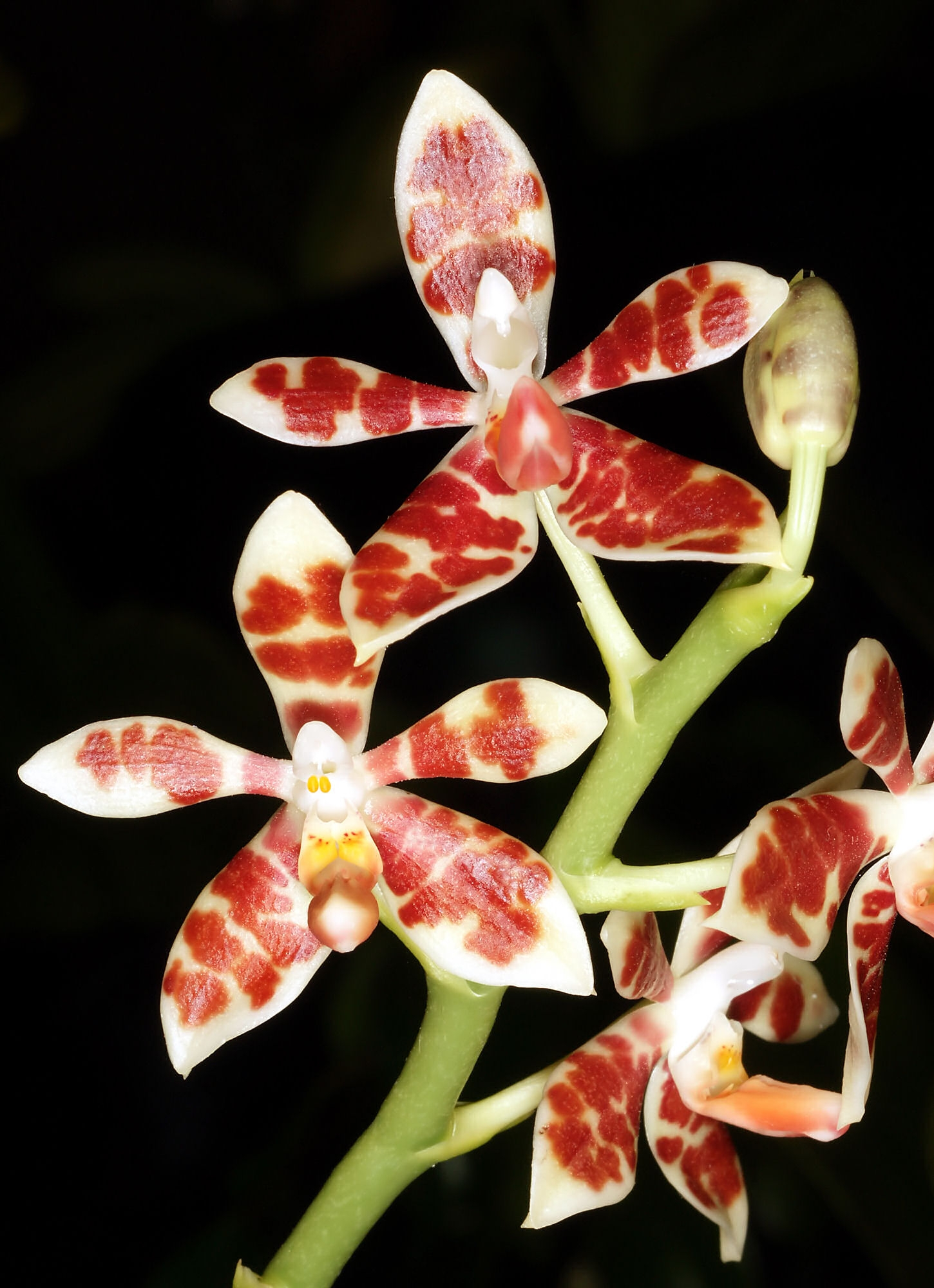
- inflorescence detail

Scientific classification
- Kingdom: Plantae
- Clade: Tracheophytes
- Clade: Angiosperms
- Clade: Monocots
- Order: Asparagales
- Family: Orchidaceae
- Subfamily: Epidendroideae
- Genus: Phalaenopsis
- Species: P. maculata

Binomial name
- Phalaenopsis maculata Rchb.f.

Synonyms
- Phalaenopsis cruciata Schltr.; Phalaenopsis maculata f. flava Christenson; Phalaenopsis muscicola Ridl.; Polychilos maculata (Rchb.f.) Shim

= Phalaenopsis maculata =

Species of lithophytic orchid

Phalaenopsis maculata is a species of orchid endemic to Peninsular Malaysia and Borneo. The specific epithet maculata, from the Latin maculatus meaning "spotted", refers to the floral colouration.

== Description ==
This epiphytic or lithophytic species has oblong-ligulate to oblong-elliptic, waxy leaves up to 21 cm long and 4 cm wide. Small, slightly cupped flowers with an off-white ground colour and reddish brown, transverse barring are produced on axillary, arching racemes or panicles. One colour morph, namely Phalaenopsis maculata f. flava Christenson, lacks anthocyanin in the flowers, which leads to a pure yellow colouration.

== Ecology ==
It predominantly occurs in serpentinite habitats, which are characterised by the open stature of the forest on serpentinite soils. It is likely the main factor contributing to the richness in terrestrial and epiphytic orchids in this habitat type. For Phalaenopsis maculata alkaline soil conditions are required. It occurs at elevations of 0–1000 m above sea level.

== Taxonomy ==
This species is placed within the section Amboinenses of the subgenus Polychilos. It is part of the two-pollinia clade of the genus Phalaenopsis. Together with Phalaenopsis doweryensis and species of the section Fuscatae, specifically Phalaenopsis viridis, Phalaenopsis cochlearis and Phalaenopsis kunstleri, it formed a unique clade, separated from other members of Phalaenopsis subgen. Polychilos. It has also been placed in a clade together with Phalaenopsis fuscata, Phalaenopsis doweryensis and Phalaenopsis gigantea, which was basal to the rest of the subgenus Polychilos.

=== Differentiation from Phalaenopsis luteola ===
This species has smaller flowers than Phalaenopsis luteola. The ground colour is off-white, tinged with green. In addition the lateral sepals are shaped differently. In Phalaenopsis maculata flowers, they are divergent and in Phalaenopsis luteola flowers, which have a yellow ground colour they are falcate to subparallel.

== Horticulture ==
It is said to be difficult to grow. This is in part to blame on the mortality of stressed plants newly extracted from their natural habitats and artificially propagated plants have been shown to perform well.

== Conservation ==
Information on the distribution of epiphytic orchids is currently insufficient. International trade is regulated through the CITES appendix II regulations of international trade.
