= Phalaenopsis rundumensis =

- CITES Appendix II (CITES)

Scientific classification
- Kingdom: Plantae
- Clade: Tracheophytes
- Clade: Angiosperms
- Clade: Monocots
- Order: Asparagales
- Family: Orchidaceae
- Subfamily: Epidendroideae
- Genus: Phalaenopsis
- Species: P. rundumensis

Binomial name
- Phalaenopsis rundumensis P.J.Cribb & A.Lamb
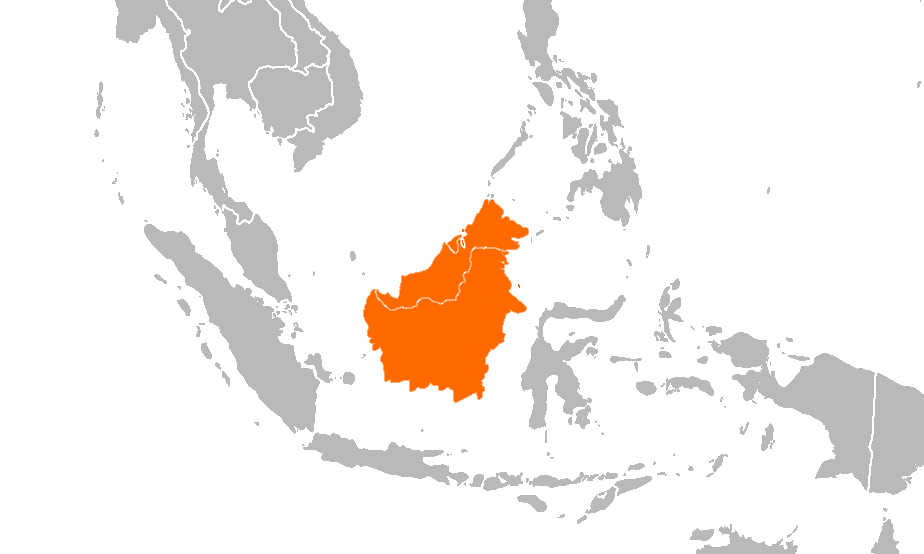
- Distribution of Phalaenopsis rundumensis

Species of orchid

Phalaenopsis rundumensis, is a species of orchid native to Borneo.

== Description ==
The plants usually have 2–3, 20–23 cm long and 7–10 cm wide leaves. The 5.8 cm high flowers with an elliptic midlobe and dentate apex of the labellum, which are sequentially produced in groups of 2–3 on a slowly elongating inflorescence, show highly variable floral colouration.

== Etymology ==
The type specimen was collected in the Rundum area of Sabah, which is reflected in the specific epithet rundumensis.

== Ecology ==
The first specimens were collected in forests at elevations of 600–800 m above sea level.

== Taxonomy ==
This species is a member of the species complex involving Phalaenopsis kapuasensis, Phalaenopsis gigantea and Phalaenopsis doweryensis. It may be intermediate between Phalaenopsis gigantea and Phalaenopsis doweryensis.
