= Phalaenopsis kapuasensis =

Scientific classification
- Kingdom: Plantae
- Clade: Tracheophytes
- Clade: Angiosperms
- Clade: Monocots
- Order: Asparagales
- Family: Orchidaceae
- Subfamily: Epidendroideae
- Genus: Phalaenopsis
- Species: P. kapuasensis

Binomial name
- Phalaenopsis kapuasensis Metusala & P.O'Byrne
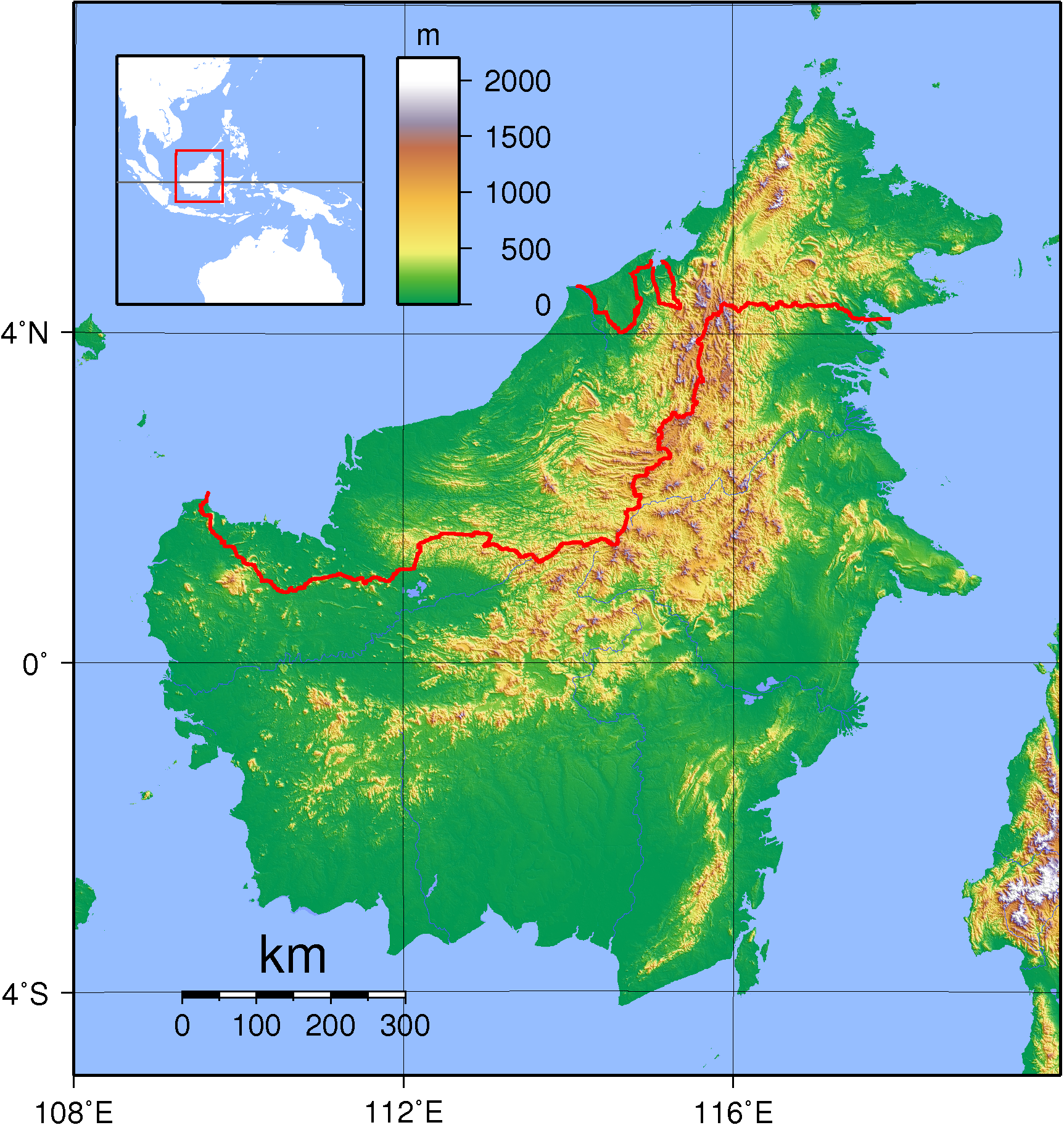
- Distribution of Phalaenopsis kapuasensis

Synonyms
- Phalaenopsis kapuasensis f. flava G.Benk, Cavestro & O.Gruss

Species of epiphytic orchid

Phalaenopsis kapuasensis, also known as the Kapuas Hulu Phalaenopsis, is a species of orchid endemic to Borneo. The specific epithet kapuasensis refers to the indonesian locality Kapuas Hulu, from which the type specimen was obtained.

== Description ==
These plants are pendent epiphytic herbs with cylindrical, green-silvery, textured, slightly flattened adventitious roots. The 4–5 cm long stem produces 3-6 pendent, green, oblong to oblong-elliptic, thick and succulent, waxy leaves, which are 22–48 cm long and 5–10 cm wide. Several pendulous, branched or unbranched inflorescences may be present on one individual. They are 10–34 cm long and may produce more than 30 flowers, of which 2-10 are open at the same time. The flowers are 2.6-3.0 cm wide, flat, greenish-yellow to pale yellow and the petals and sepals bear transverse, brown barring. The midlobe of the otherwise white labellum has purple longitudinal lines on the adaxial surface and pink suffusion on the abaxial surface.

== Ecology ==
This species is found in lowland forests at elevations of 50–200 m above sea level.

== Taxonomy ==
This species is a member of the species complex including three other endemic species of Borneo, specifically Phalaenopsis gigantea, Phalaenopsis doweryensis and Phalaenopsis rundumensis.

=== Differentiation from Phalaenopsis gigantea ===
This species has narrower leaves than Phalaenopsis gigantea. They are only up to 10 cm wide. The smaller flowers, which are only 26–30 mm wide, with narrower tepals are produced sequentially.
Phalaenopsis gigantea has broader leaves and flowers and the flowers may open simultaneously. In addition, the labellum of Phalaenopsis gigantea never has trichomes, unlike Phalaenopsis kapuasensis.

=== Differentiation from Phalaenopsis doweryensis ===
The midlobes of Phalaenopsis kapuasensis flowers do not have extensions on the upper lateral margins and they have trichomes on the upper surface of the labellum.
Flowers of Phalaenopsis doweryensis do have these extensions, while trichomes are absent.

=== Differentiation from Phalaenopsis rundumensis ===
Phalaenopsis kapuasensis has smaller flowers than Phalaenopsis rundumensis. They have oblong sidelobes. Trichomes are present on the upper surface of the labellum midlobe.
These features are not present in Phalaenopsis rundumensis flowers, which are larger and have triangular lateral lobes of the labellum. The labellum midlobe is hairless and the lateral margin is pappilose.

== Conservation ==
Information on the distribution of epiphytic orchids, such as Phalaenopsis kapuasensis is currently insufficient. Steady poaching of wild populations for private gain occurs. Newly collected specimens are traded commercially, instead of being donated to botanic gardens. The precise location of observed populations are withheld from public knowledge, as a measure to protect them from illegal collection. International trade is regulated through the CITES appendix II regulations of international trade.
