= Phalaenopsis luteola =

Scientific classification
- Kingdom: Plantae
- Clade: Tracheophytes
- Clade: Angiosperms
- Clade: Monocots
- Order: Asparagales
- Family: Orchidaceae
- Subfamily: Epidendroideae
- Genus: Phalaenopsis
- Species: P. luteola

Binomial name
- Phalaenopsis luteola Burb. ex Garay, Christenson & O.Gruss
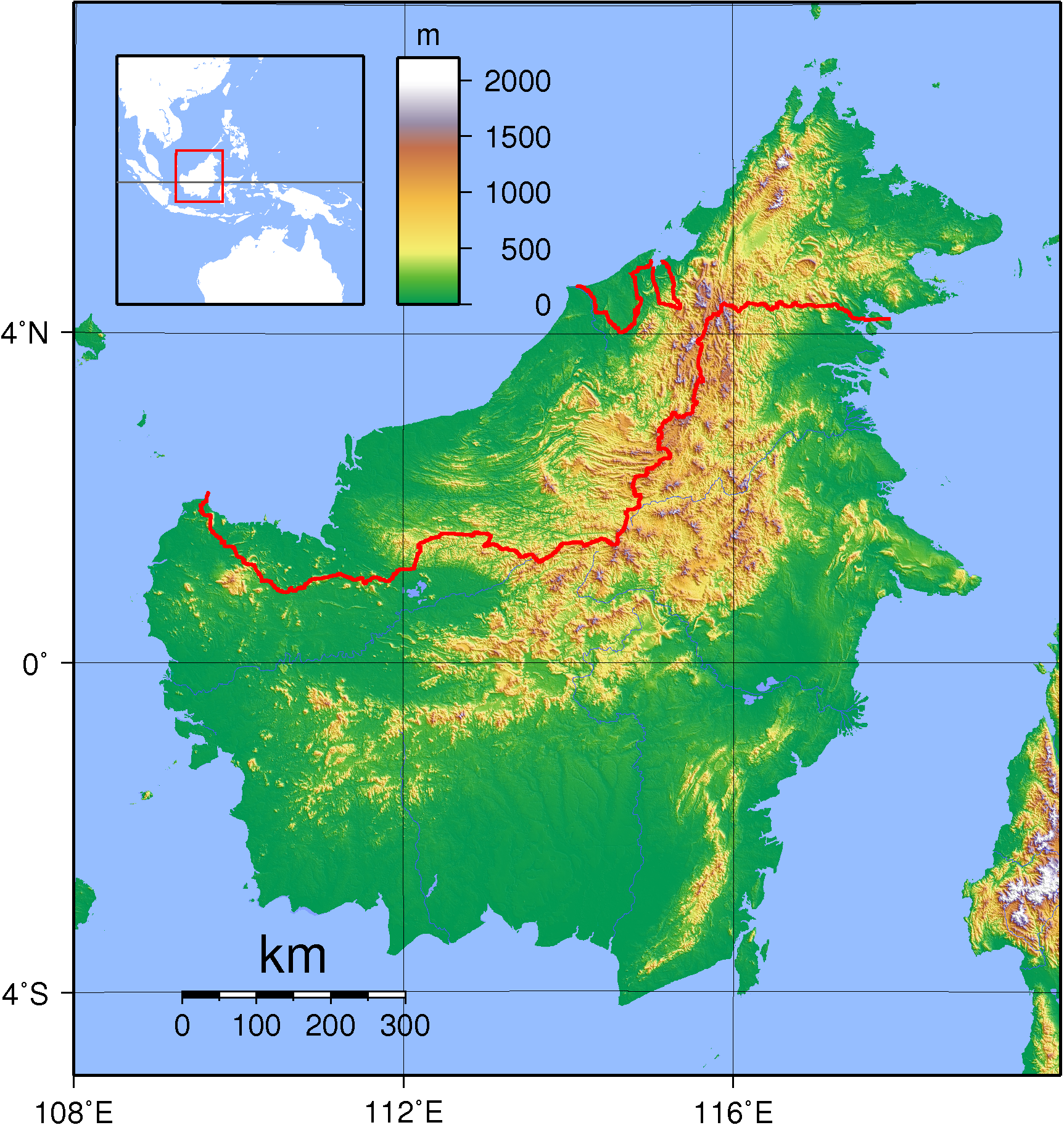
- Distribution of Phalaenopsis luteola

Species of lithophytic orchid

Phalaenopsis luteola is a species of flowering plant in the Family Orchidaceae. It is endemic to Borneo. The specific epithet luteola, from the Latin luteolus meaning "yellowish", refers to the floral colouration.

== Description ==
These lithophytic plants have fleshy adventitious roots, which are produced on very short stems, which bear up to three leaves. The leaves are elliptic, sessile, up to 20 cm long and 5 cm wide. Axillary, arching racemes produce 2-3 pale yellow flowers with irregular brown transverse barring. The lateral lobes of the labellum are yellow and the middle lobe is red.

== Ecology ==
This species is found on wet mossy rock.

== Taxonomy ==
This species is accepted. However, two sources regard it as synonym of Phalaenopsis pantherina.

=== Differentiation from Phalaenopsis maculata ===
This species has larger flowers than Phalaenopsis maculata. The ground colour is yellow and the lateral sepals are shaped differently. In Phalaenopsis maculata flowers, which have an off-white ground colour tinged with green, they are divergent and in Phalaenopsis luteola they are falcate to subparallel.

== Horticulture ==
This species is very rarely cultivated. It has been reintroduced to cultivation by Gruss and Röllke in Germany.

== Conservation ==
Information on the distribution of epiphytic orchids is currently insufficient. It appears to be rare in nature and the information needed for conservation efforts is lacking. International trade is regulated through the CITES appendix II regulations of international trade.
