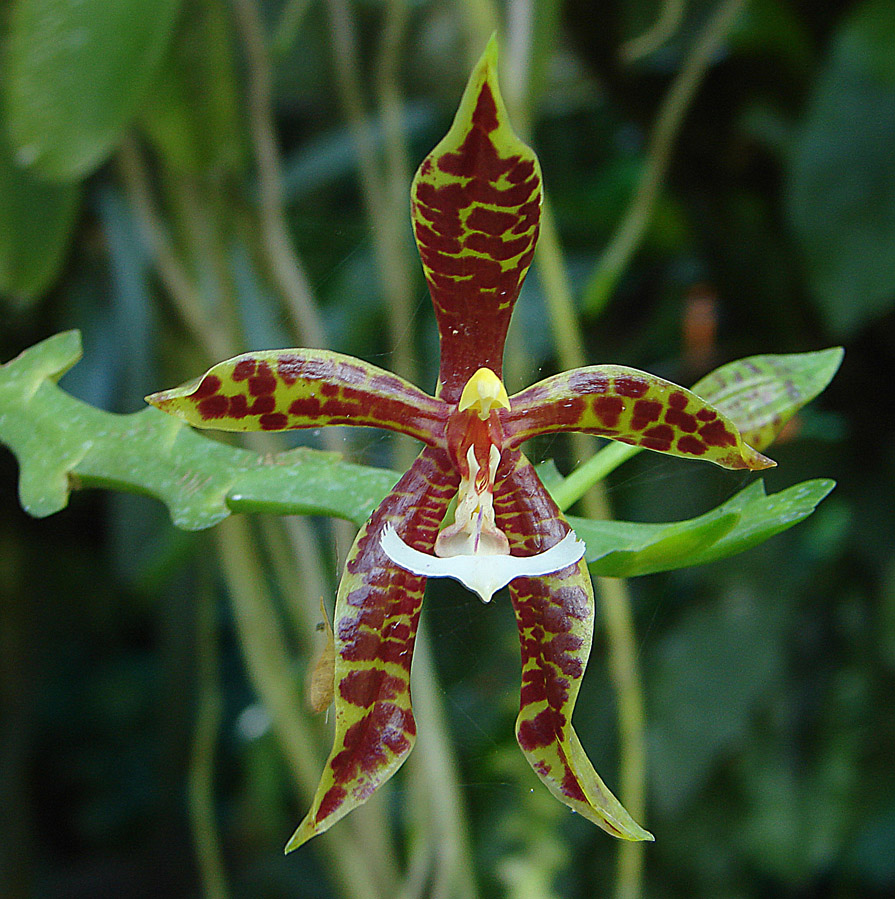

Scientific classification
- Kingdom: Plantae
- Clade: Tracheophytes
- Clade: Angiosperms
- Clade: Monocots
- Order: Asparagales
- Family: Orchidaceae
- Subfamily: Epidendroideae
- Genus: Phalaenopsis
- Species: P. pantherina

Binomial name
- Phalaenopsis pantherina Rchb.f.
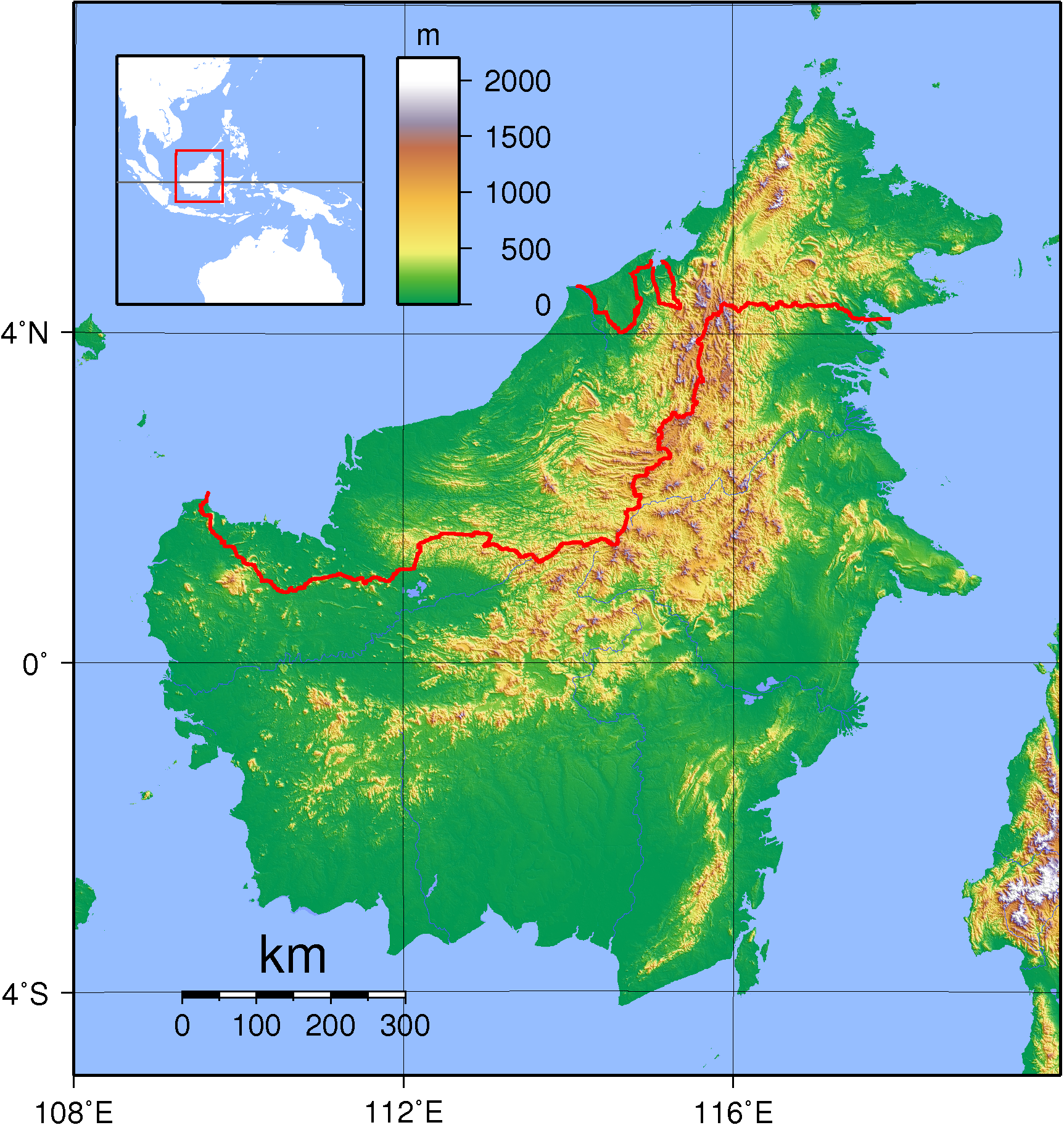
- distribution of Phalaenopsis pantherina

Synonyms
- Phalaenopsis cornu-cervi var. pantherina (Rchb.f.) O.Gruss & M.Wolff; Polychilos pantherina (Rchb.f.) Shim

= Phalaenopsis pantherina =

Species of epiphytic orchid

Phalaenopsis pantherina, also known as the panther-like Phalaenopsis, is a species of orchid endemic to Borneo. The specific epithet pantherina is derived from the leopard-like floral colouration.

== Description ==
Phalaenopsis pantherina is an epiphyte with up to 15 cm long stems, extremely thick adventitious roots and up to 20 cm long, 4 cm wide, oblong to oblong-elliptic, pale green leaves. The branched or unbranched, up to 25 cm long, strongly flattened inflorescences with distichous, fleshy floral bracts produce yellow flowers with reddish brownspots and transverse barring. The midlobe of the labellum bears trichomes. The morphology of the labellum is an important feature for species delimitation.

== Ecology ==
This species has been recorded at altitudes of 400–500 m above sea level. It grows well with air temperatures of 23°-26 °C. At this altitude the air temperature is 24.5 °C in average.

== Taxonomy ==
Within the subgenus Polychilos it is placed in the section Polychilos. It is therefore closely related to Phalaenopsis mannii and Phalaenopsis cornu-cervi (syn. Phalaenopsis lamelligera et Phalaenopsis borneensis). The species itself was once regarded as a variety of Phalaenopsis cornu-cervi and was described as Phalaenopsis cornu-cervi var. pantherina (Rchb.f.) O.Gruss & M.Wolff. However this is not accepted. It has also been erroneously been proposed, that Phalaenopsis luteola is a synonym of Phalaenopsis pantherina.

== Conservation ==
It occurs in protected habitats, such as Crocker Range National Park. It has been rarely collected for botanical or horticultural purposes.
