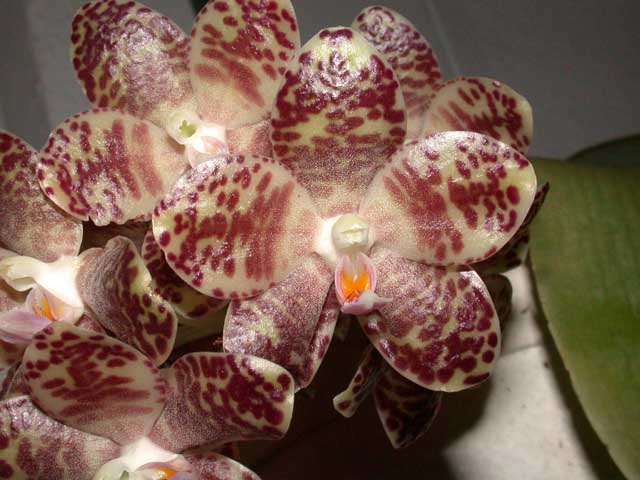
- Flower of Phalaenopsis gigantea

Scientific classification
- Kingdom: Plantae
- Clade: Tracheophytes
- Clade: Angiosperms
- Clade: Monocots
- Order: Asparagales
- Family: Orchidaceae
- Subfamily: Epidendroideae
- Genus: Phalaenopsis
- Species: P. gigantea

Binomial name
- Phalaenopsis gigantea J.J.Sm.
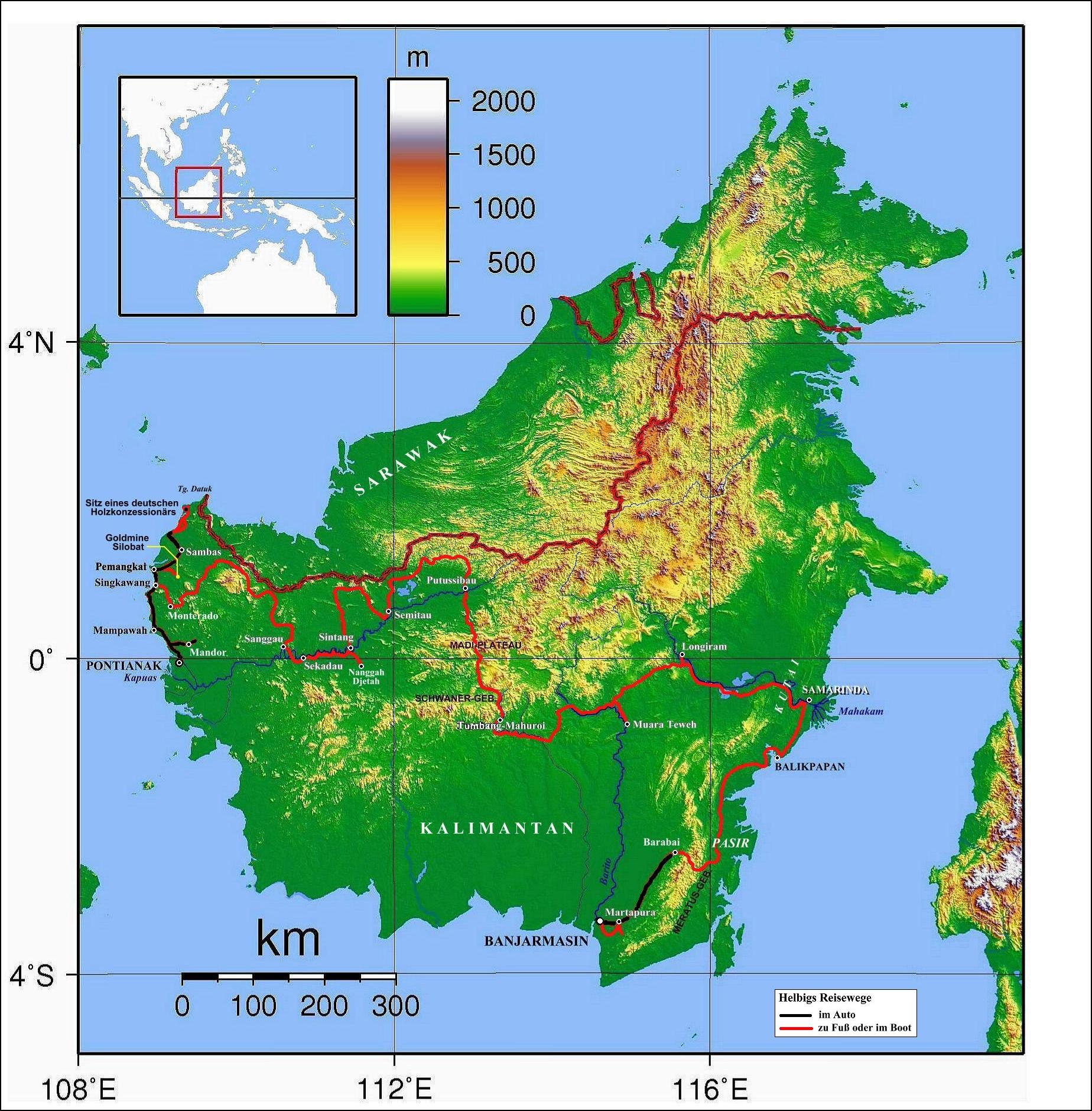
- Borneo, where Phalaenopsis gigantea occurs

Synonyms
- Polychilos gigantea (J.J.Sm.) Shim; Phalaenopsis gigantea var. decolorata Braem ex Holle-De Raeve; Phalaenopsis gigantea var. aurea Christenson; Phalaenopsis gigantea f. decolorata (Braem ex Holle-De Raeve) Christenson

= Phalaenopsis gigantea =

Species of orchid

Phalaenopsis gigantea is a species of orchid endemic to the island of Borneo and was first described in 1909. The specific epithet gigantea refers to the giant size of its fleshy leaves, which can grow to over 60 cm in length on a mature plant. It is the largest known Phalaenopsis species.

== Description ==
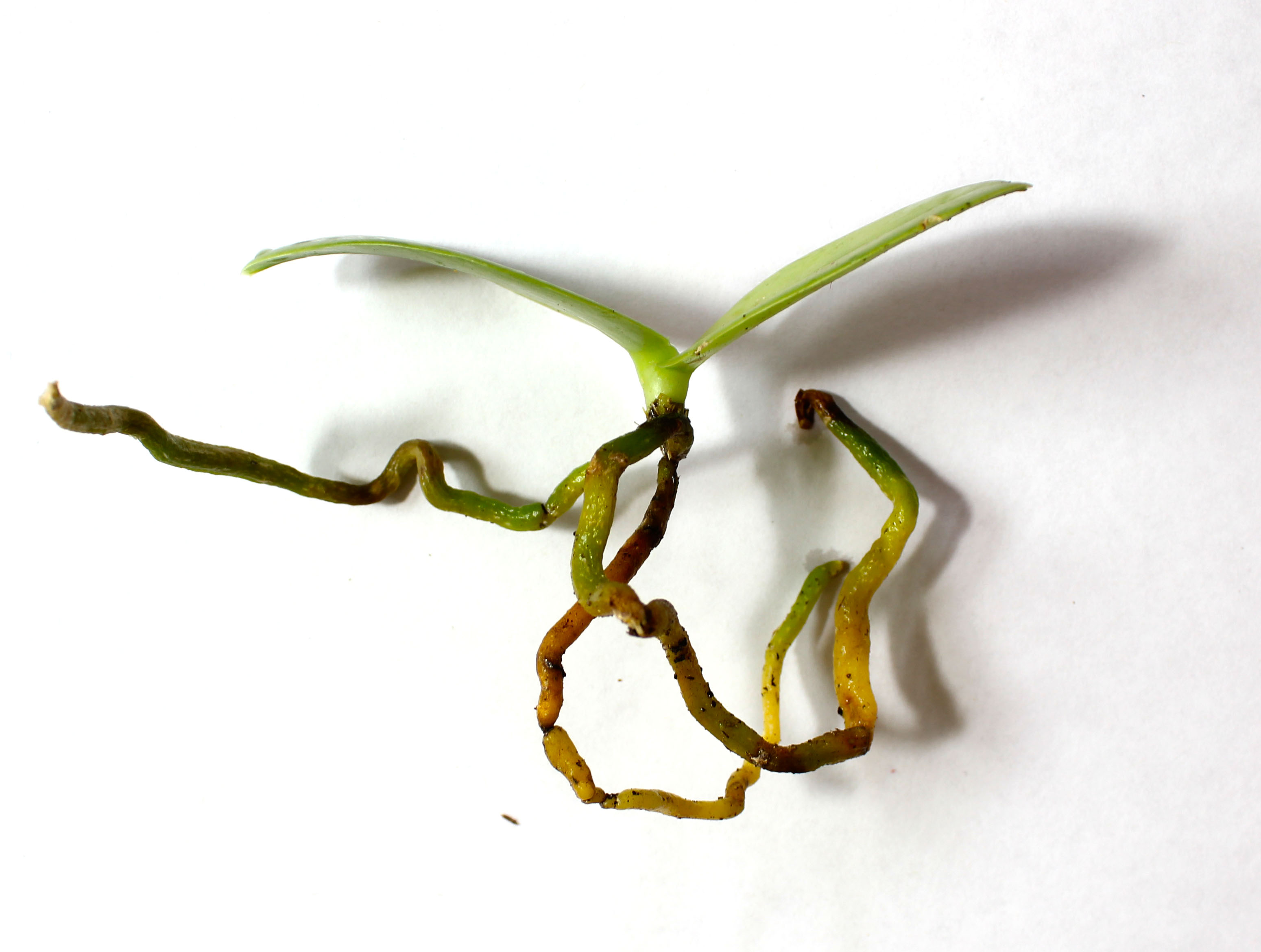
Phalaenopsis gigantea seedling

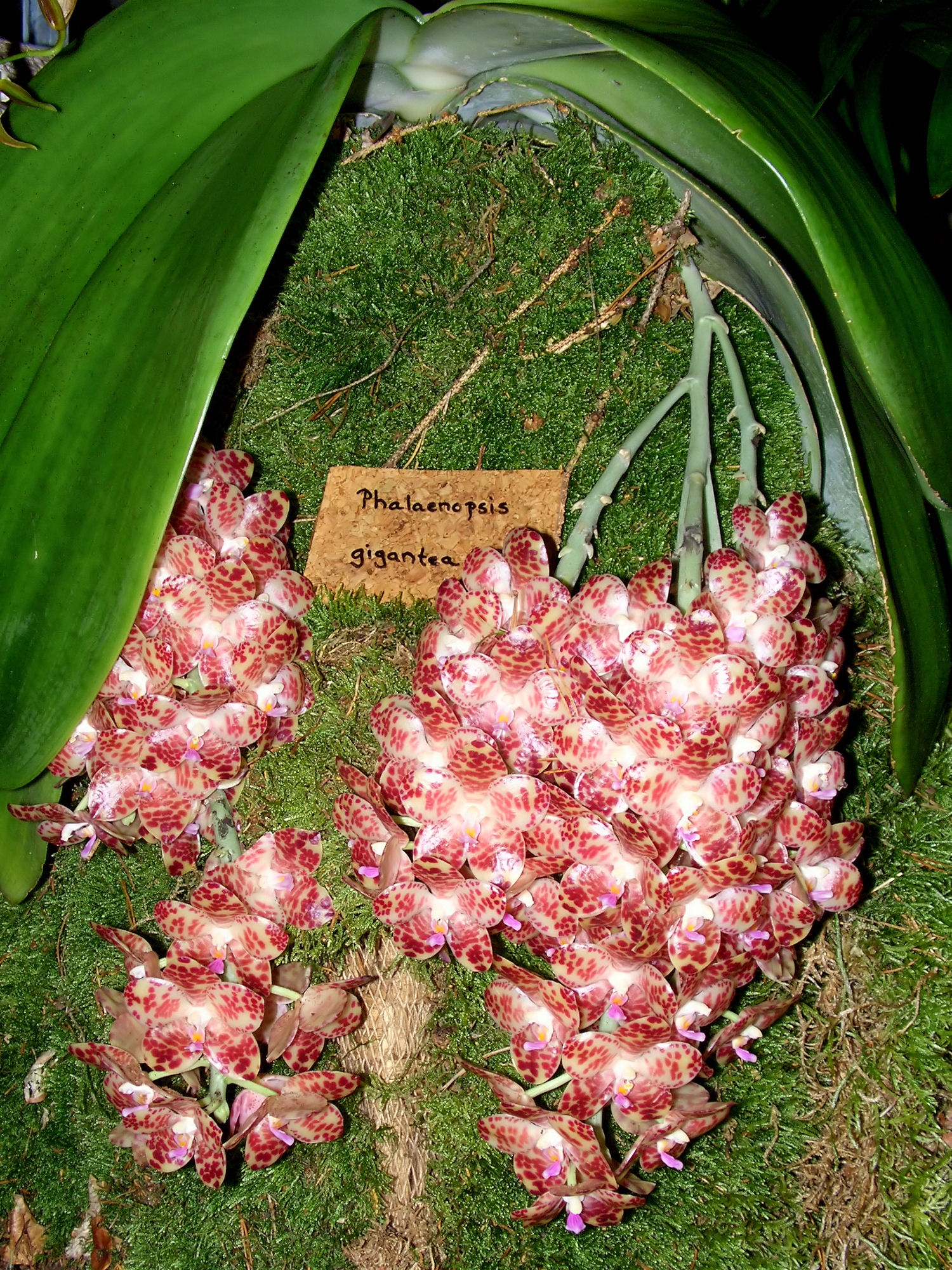
Phalaenopsis gigantea inflorescence

- A very short monopodial stem with 5-6 large silvery-green pendent leaves that can measure over 60 cm (24 in) long by 22.5 cm (8.9 in) wide.
- flowers are ~5 cm across (up to 6.5 cm), cream background with raised red-brown spots, and varying degrees of green around the column, waxy
- Mature, specimen-size plants are capable of producing hundreds of flowers on pendent, branching inflorescences reaching 40 centimeters
- blooms have sweetly fragrant citrus scent
- flowers can last many months
- inflorescence can rebloom over many seasons
- Although widespread belief that this orchid takes anywhere from 8 to 12 years for a seedling to reach flowering size, it may be possible to flower seedlings in 4 years with ideal culture

== Taxonomy ==
This species is a member of the species complex involving Phalaenopsis kapuasensis, Phalaenopsis rundumensis and Phalaenopsis doweryensis.

=== Species variants ===
- Phal. gigantea var aurea: has a brighter yellow background color throughout the sepals and petals

== Growing conditions ==
- warm to hot growing orchid
- although not difficult to grow, (gigantea) seedlings take significantly longer to reach maturity than other species
- particularly susceptible to rot if water gets trapped between the leaves
- allow potting media to dry out completely between watering
- Phal. gigantea needs its entire root system to keep the large leaves hydrated, so as a result is very sensitive to getting its roots disrupted
- prefers higher light than most phalaenopsis

== Use in horticulture ==
This plant has been used in the creation of Phalaenopsis hybrids, as its huge size and pendent inflorescences are recessive traits in crosses with complex tetraploid hybrids. Two colour morphs are significant to horticulture: paler brown patterns without red colouration against a yellow ground colour and secondly brown-red patterns against a yellow ground colour. As of February 2022, the International Orchid Register of the Royal Horticultural Society lists 321 registered hybrids involving this species.
