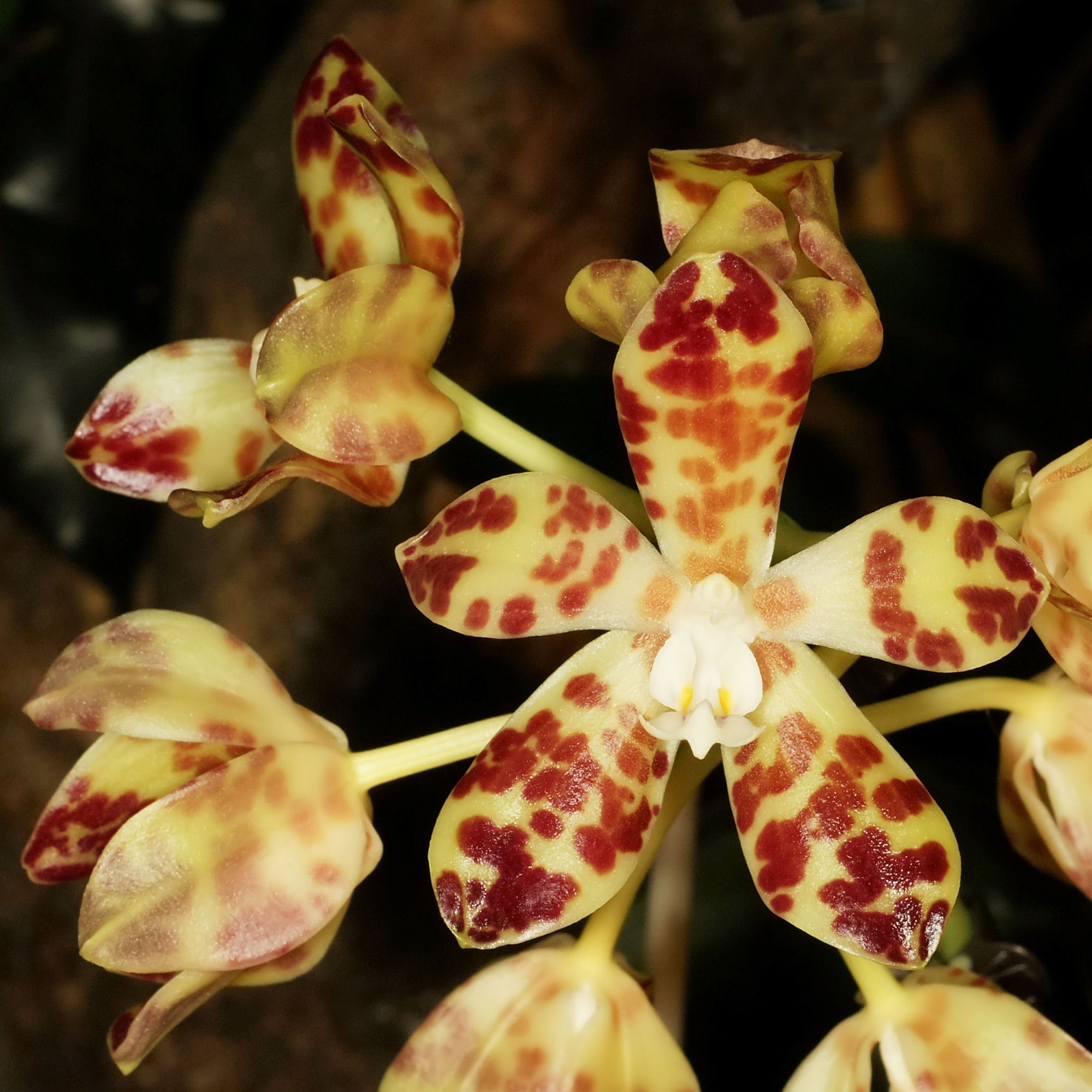
- inflorescence detail

Scientific classification
- Kingdom: Plantae
- Clade: Tracheophytes
- Clade: Angiosperms
- Clade: Monocots
- Order: Asparagales
- Family: Orchidaceae
- Subfamily: Epidendroideae
- Genus: Phalaenopsis
- Species: P. doweryensis

Binomial name
- Phalaenopsis doweryensis Garay & Christenson
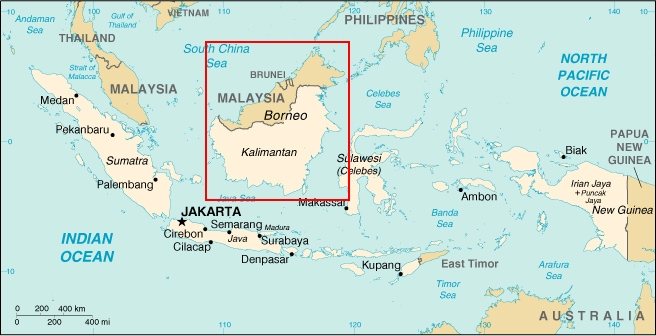
- distribution of "Phalaenopsis doweryensis"

Synonyms
- Phalaenopsis doweryensis f. flavocrameriana O.Gruss & J.Y.Wang

= Phalaenopsis doweryensis =

Species of epiphytic orchid

Phalaenopsis doweryensis is a species of flowering plant in the Family Orchidaceae. It is native to Borneo.

== Description ==
This species of epiphytic, short-stemmed orchid has usually two fleshy, ovate-elliptic, obtuse leaves of variable sizes. Fleshy flowers with a greenish yellow ground colour and brown spotting are produced on erect, axillary racemes, which may reach lengths of 20 cm, but are usually shorter than the leaves. The specific epithet doweryensis refers to the Dowery Orchid Nursery, from which the type specimen was acquired, which was collected from the wild in Sabah, East Malaysia.

== Taxonomy ==
This species is placed within the subgenus Polychilos in the section Amboinenses as part of the Gigantea complex. It is suspected of being a hybrid of Phalaenopsis gigantea and Phalaenopsis cochlearis or Phalaenopsis kunstleri. However, it could not be concluded on the basis of morphological and genetic evidence, that this species is a hybrid of Phalaenopsis gigantea and Phalaenopsis cochlearis or Phalaenopsis kunstleri. At least not a F1-hybrid.

== Conservation ==
This species is protected unter the CITES appendix II regulations of international trade.
