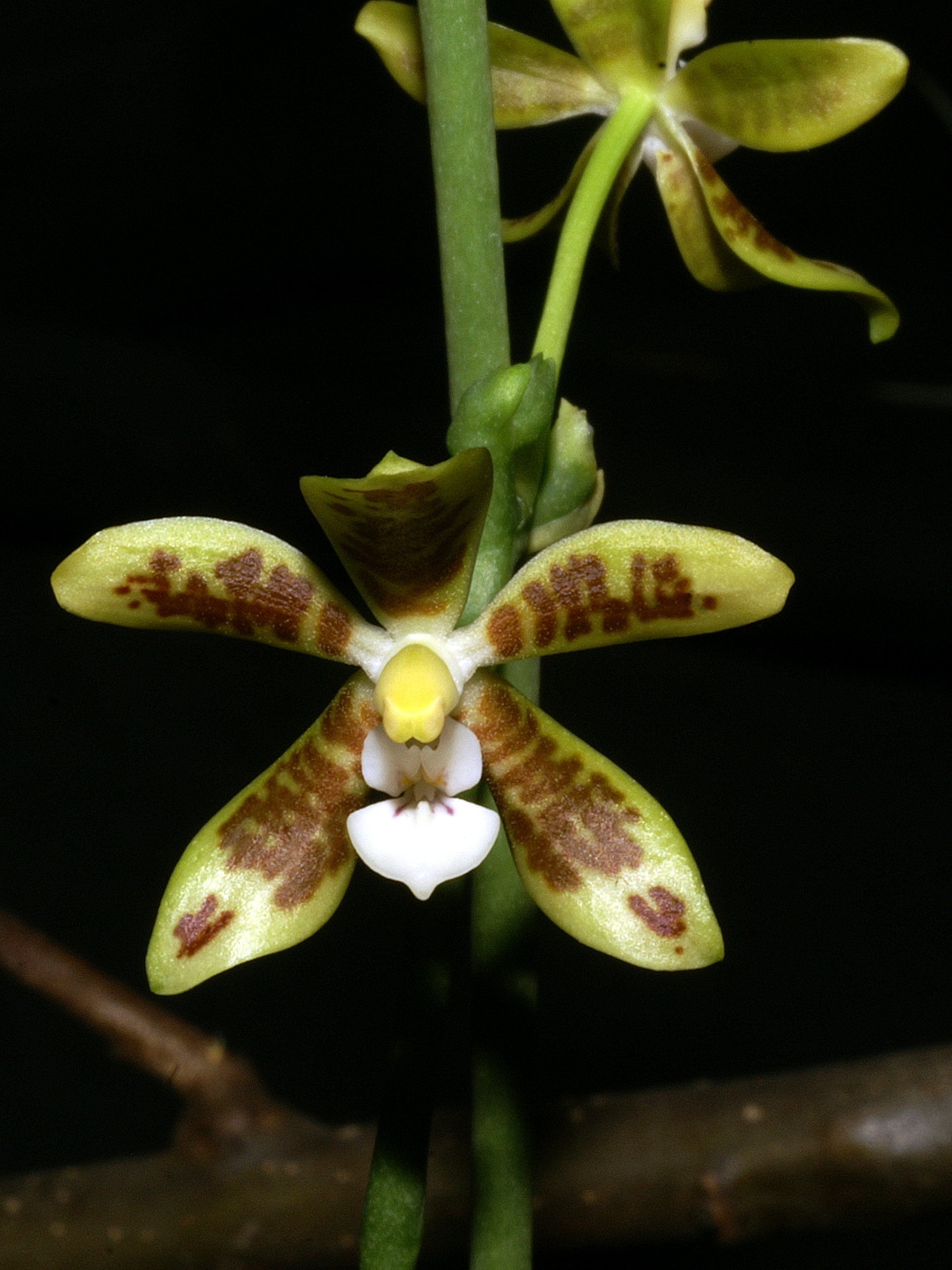
- Phalaenopsis viridis flower detail

Scientific classification
- Kingdom: Plantae
- Clade: Tracheophytes
- Clade: Angiosperms
- Clade: Monocots
- Order: Asparagales
- Family: Orchidaceae
- Subfamily: Epidendroideae
- Genus: Phalaenopsis
- Species: P. viridis

Binomial name
- Phalaenopsis viridis J.J.Sm.
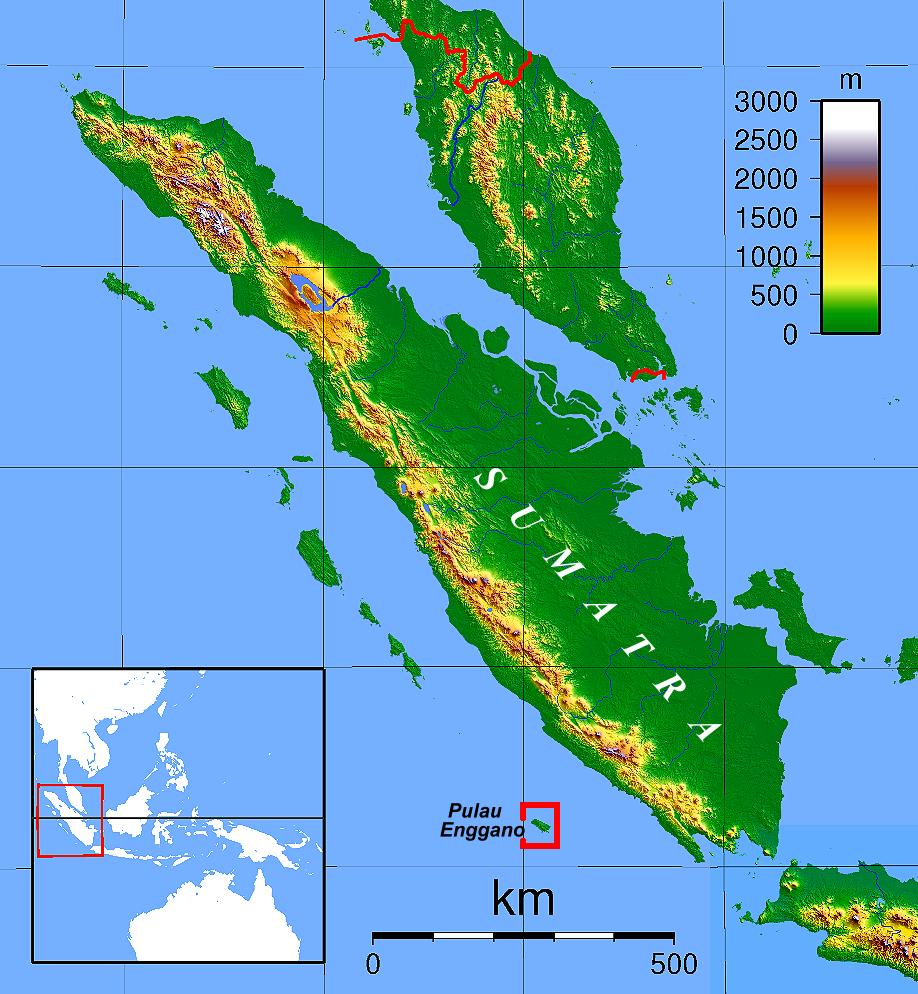
- Distribution of Phalaenopsis viridis

Synonyms
- Phalaenopsis forbesii Ridl.; Polychilos viridis (J.J.Sm.) Shim

= Phalaenopsis viridis =

Species of orchid

Phalaenopsis viridis is a species of orchid native to the Indonesian island of Sumatra.

== Description ==
This epiphytic species has 30 cm long and 8 cm wide, ovate to elliptic ovate leaves. The simultaneously opening flowers have brown colouration overlaying the green ground colour. The area of the column and labellum is devoid of such colouration. The inflorescence is erect and strongly lignified.

== Ecology ==
This species grows in limestone and in open fields, where it is faced with low nutrient availability and drought, which in turn favours lignification of sclerenchyma. It is found at altitudes of 1000 m above sea level.

== Etymology ==
The specific epithet viridis means green and refers to the floral colouration.
