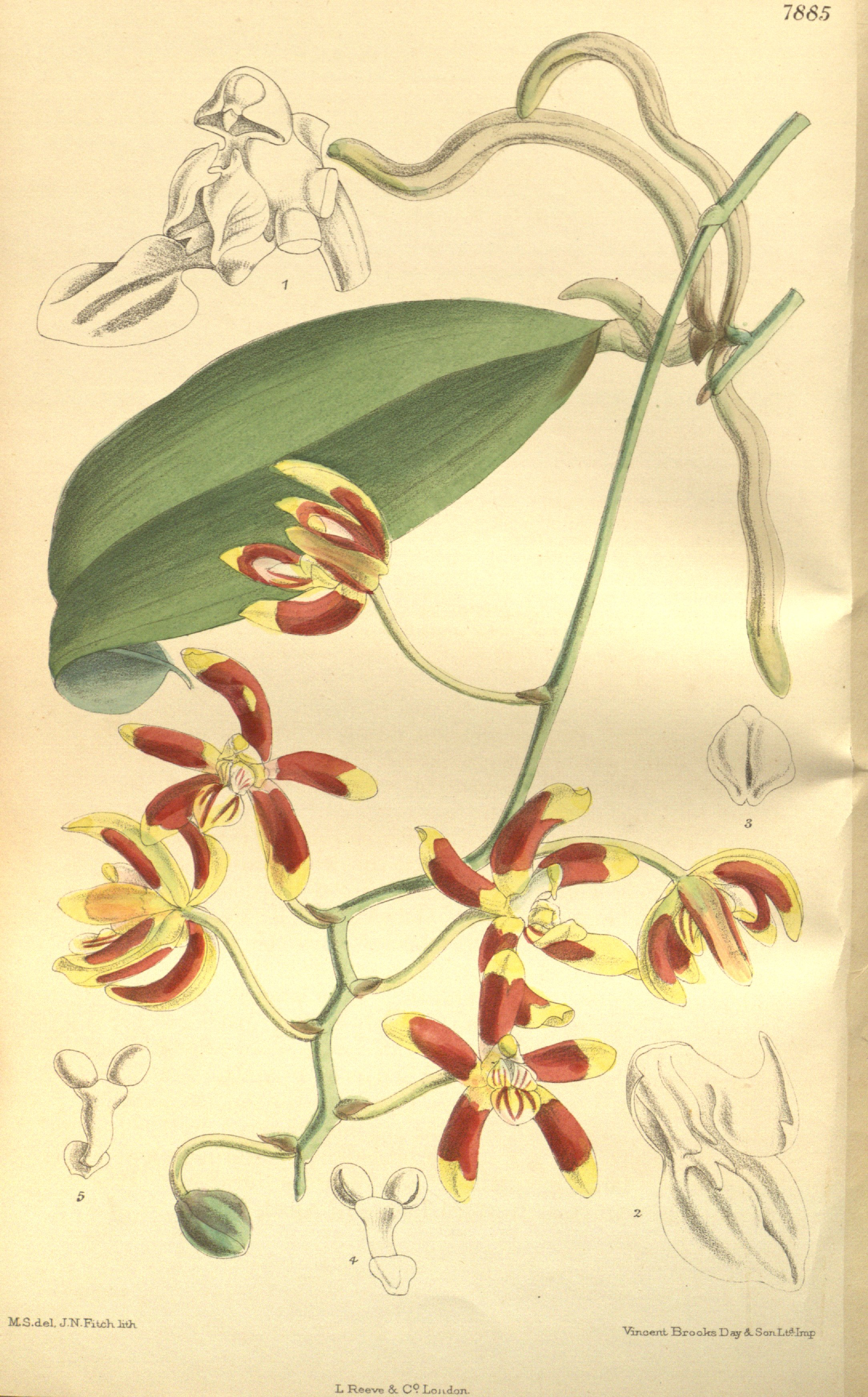
- Flower of Phalaenopsis kunstleri

Scientific classification
- Kingdom: Plantae
- Clade: Tracheophytes
- Clade: Angiosperms
- Clade: Monocots
- Order: Asparagales
- Family: Orchidaceae
- Subfamily: Epidendroideae
- Genus: Phalaenopsis
- Species: P. kunstleri

Binomial name
- Phalaenopsis kunstleri Hook.f.

Synonyms
- Polychilos kunstleri (Hook.f.) Shim

= Phalaenopsis kunstleri =

Species of orchid

Phalaenopsis kunstleri is a species of orchid found from Myanmar to peninsular Malaysia.
