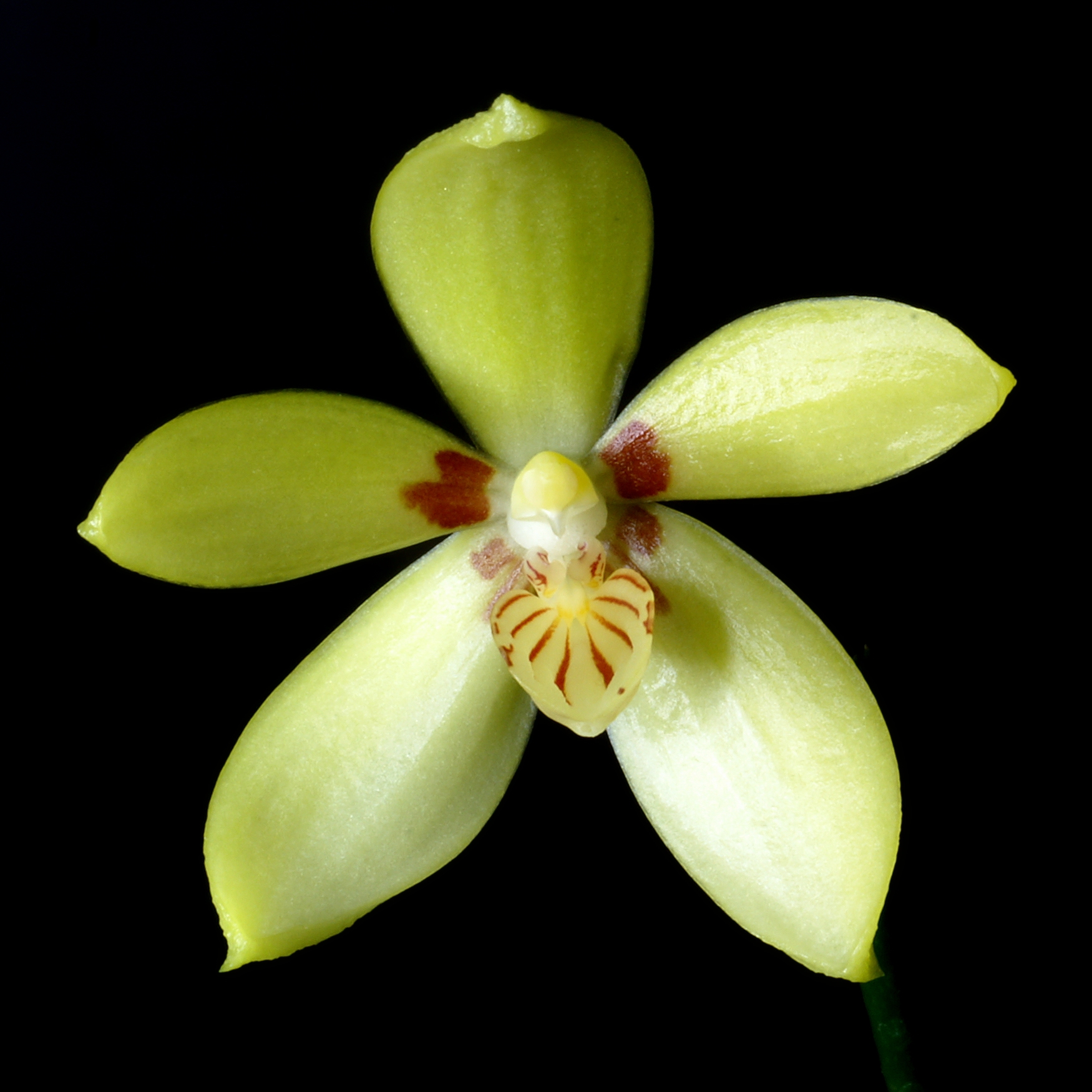
- Flower detail

Scientific classification
- Kingdom: Plantae
- Clade: Tracheophytes
- Clade: Angiosperms
- Clade: Monocots
- Order: Asparagales
- Family: Orchidaceae
- Subfamily: Epidendroideae
- Genus: Phalaenopsis
- Species: P. cochlearis

Binomial name
- Phalaenopsis cochlearis Holttum

Synonyms
- Polychilos cochlearis (Holttum) Shim

= Phalaenopsis cochlearis =

Species of orchid

Phalaenopsis cochlearis is a species of orchid native to peninsular Malaysia to Borneo.

== Description ==
These lithophytic or epiphytic herbs have oblong-elliptic to elliptic-obovate, subacute, up to 22 cm long and 8 cm wide, distichously arranged leaves. Many pale yellow, glossy flowers are produced on panicles up to 50 cm in length. The peduncle of the inflorescence is erect, but the branches are arching to subpendent. The species occurs at elevations of 500-700 m a.s.l. The specific epithet cochlearis is derived from Latin, meaning "concave like a spoon", which refers to the morphology of the labellum.

== Conservation ==
This species is protected unter the CITES appendix II regulations of international trade. The species is regarded as critically endangered and illegal collecting is a problem in their habitat. It is threatened by small-scale logging, quarrying, land clearance for traditional farming and collecting for trade. Locals collect wild plants and sell them to nurseries, which ultimately export plants to the US, Japan and Europe. Ex-situ conservation through artificial propagation would be beneficial.
