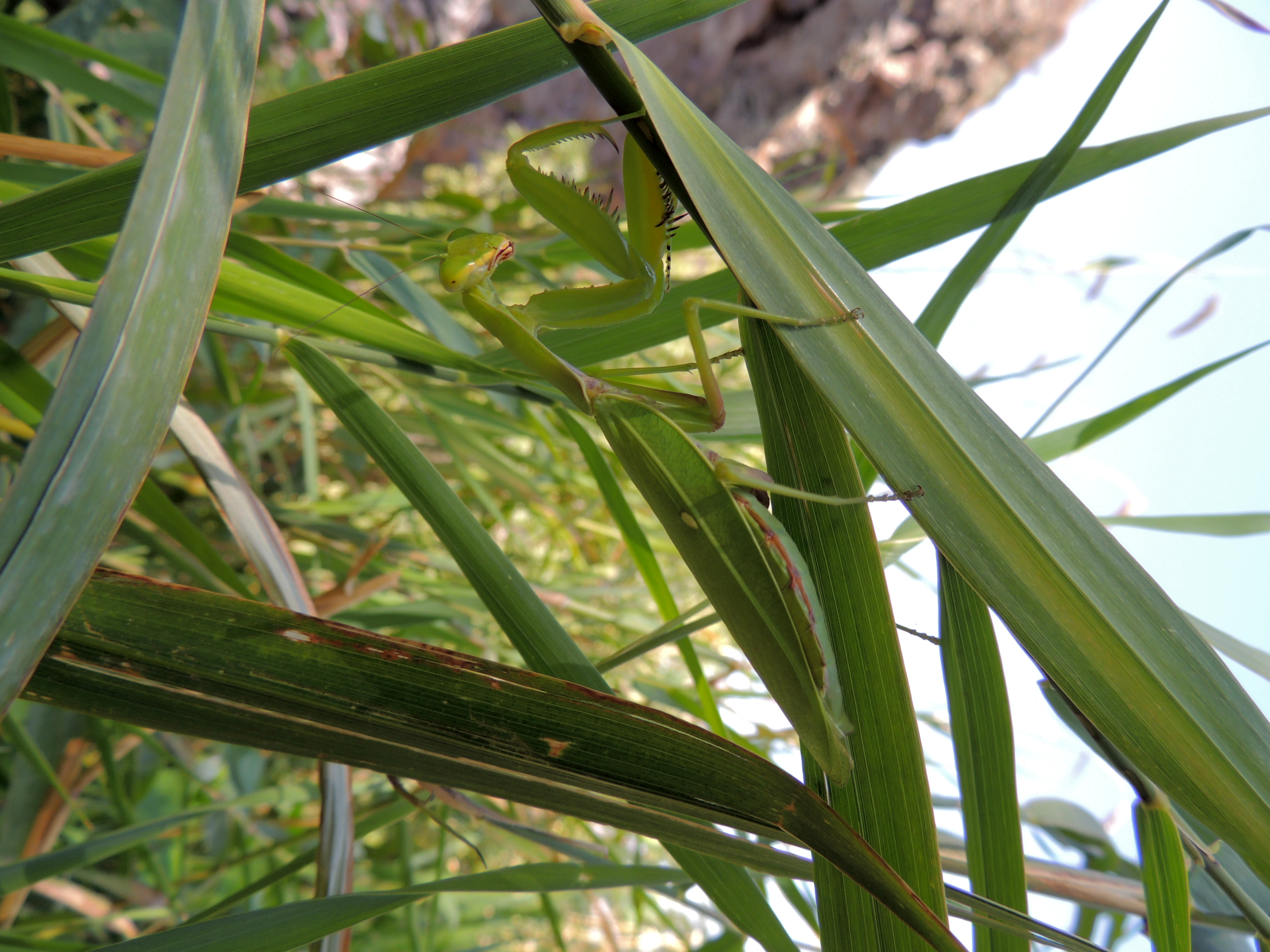

Conservation status
- Least Concern (IUCN 3.1)

Scientific classification
- Kingdom: Animalia
- Phylum: Arthropoda
- Clade: Pancrustacea
- Class: Insecta
- Order: Mantodea
- Family: Mantidae
- Subfamily: Hierodulinae
- Tribe: Hierodulini
- Genus: Hierodula
- Species: H. tenuidentata

Binomial name
- Hierodula tenuidentata Saussure, 1869

Subspecies
- Hierodula tenuidentata darvasica Lindt, 1963; Hierodula tenuidentata tenuidentata Saussure, 1869

= Hierodula tenuidentata =

Species of praying mantis

Hierodula tenuidentata is a species of praying mantis, sharing its common name giant Asian mantis with other large members of genus Hierodula in the family Mantidae. It is native to Pakistan and India, and has been introduced to Greece and elsewhere in southern Europe, including Italy, Hungary, Romania, and Serbia.

== Behaviour ==
It has learned to opportunistically prey on fish.

== Subspecies ==
There are two valid subspecies belong to the species Hierodula tenuidentata
