= Hierodula jobina =

Scientific classification
- Kingdom: Animalia
- Phylum: Arthropoda
- Class: Insecta
- Order: Mantodea
- Family: Mantidae
- Subfamily: Hierodulinae
- Tribe: Hierodulini
- Genus: Hierodula
- Species: H. jobina

Binomial name
- Hierodula jobina Giglio-Tos, 1912

Species of praying mantis

Hierodula jobina is a species of praying mantis in the family Mantidae.
