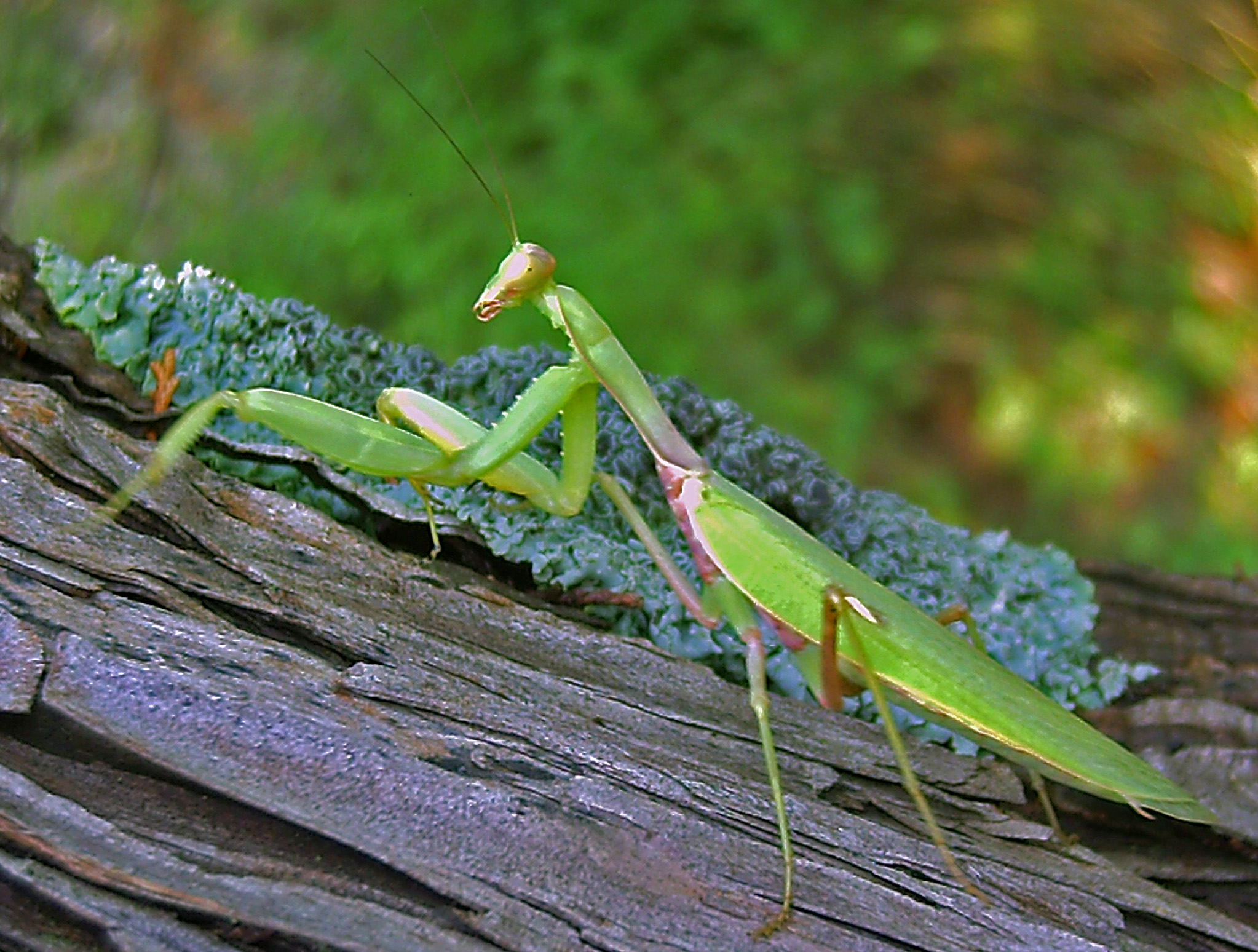

Scientific classification
- Kingdom: Animalia
- Phylum: Arthropoda
- Class: Insecta
- Order: Mantodea
- Family: Mantidae
- Subfamily: Hierodulinae
- Tribe: Hierodulini
- Genus: Hierodula
- Species: H. transcaucasica

Binomial name
- Hierodula transcaucasica Brunner von Wattenwyl, 1878

= Hierodula transcaucasica =

Species of praying mantis

Transcaucasian Giant Mantis (Hierodula transcaucasica) is a species of praying mantis in the family Mantidae.

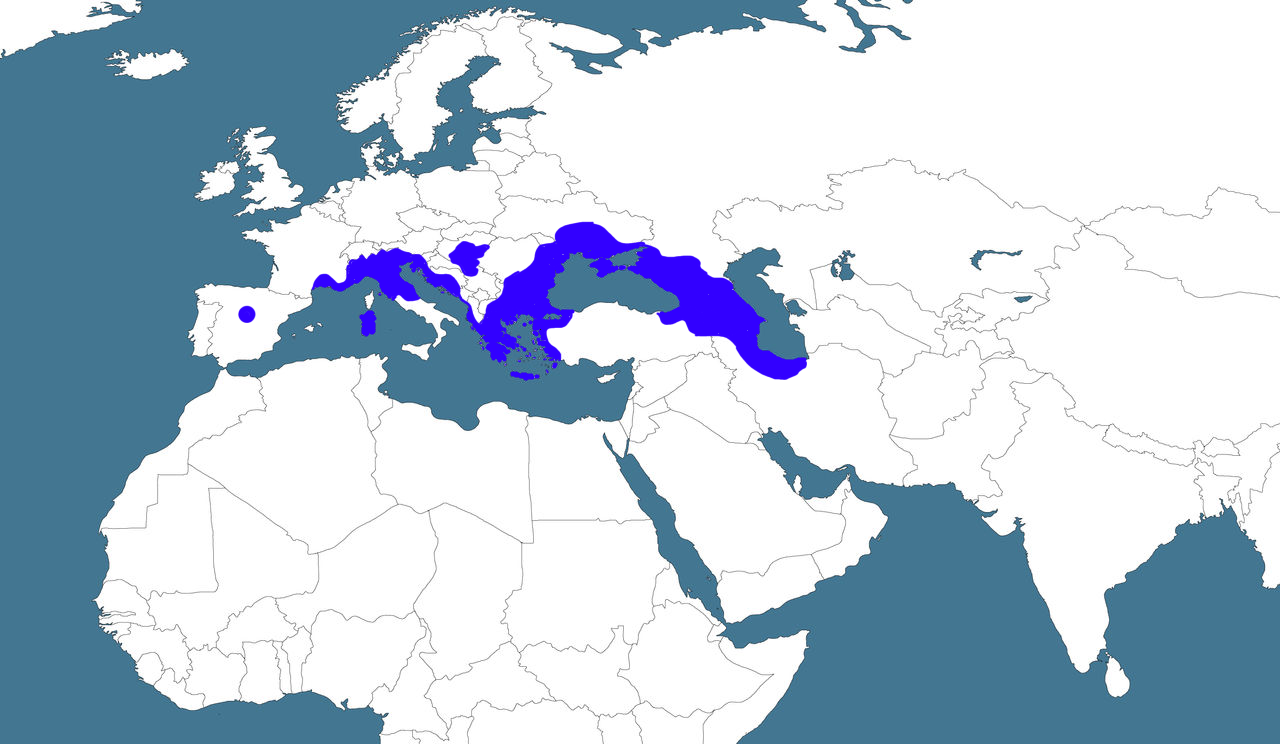
Map of the habitat
