= Hierodula parviceps =

Scientific classification
- Domain: Eukaryota
- Kingdom: Animalia
- Phylum: Arthropoda
- Class: Insecta
- Order: Mantodea
- Family: Mantidae
- Subfamily: Hierodulinae
- Tribe: Hierodulini
- Genus: Hierodula
- Species: H. parviceps

Binomial name
- Hierodula parviceps Stal, 1877

Species of praying mantis

Hierodula parviceps is a species of praying mantis in the family Mantidae, also known as the Marbled Mantis and is native to Southeast Asian countries such as the Philippines.
