= Hierodula timorensis =

Scientific classification
- Kingdom: Animalia
- Phylum: Arthropoda
- Clade: Pancrustacea
- Class: Insecta
- Order: Mantodea
- Family: Mantidae
- Subfamily: Hierodulinae
- Tribe: Hierodulini
- Genus: Hierodula
- Species: H. timorensis

Binomial name
- Hierodula timorensis de Haan, 1842

Species of praying mantis

Hierodula timorensis, the Timor Giant Mantis, is a species of praying mantis from the family Mantidae. It is found on the island of Timor.
