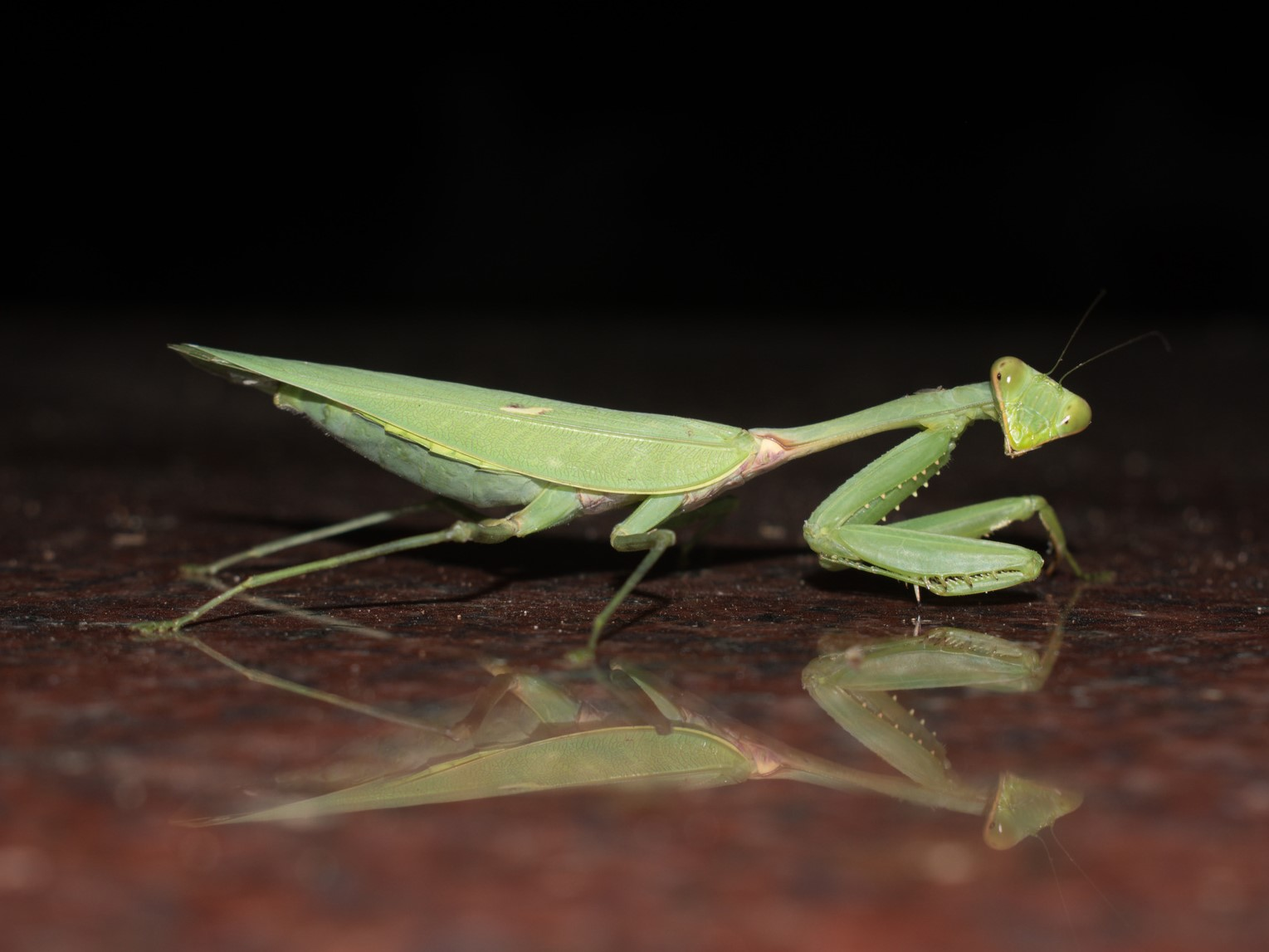

Scientific classification
- Kingdom: Animalia
- Phylum: Arthropoda
- Class: Insecta
- Order: Mantodea
- Family: Mantidae
- Subfamily: Hierodulinae
- Tribe: Hierodulini
- Genus: Hierodula
- Species: H. ventralis

Binomial name
- Hierodula ventralis Giglio-Tos, 1912

= Hierodula ventralis =

Species of praying mantis

Hierodula ventralis is a species of praying mantis in the family Mantidae.

== Gallery ==
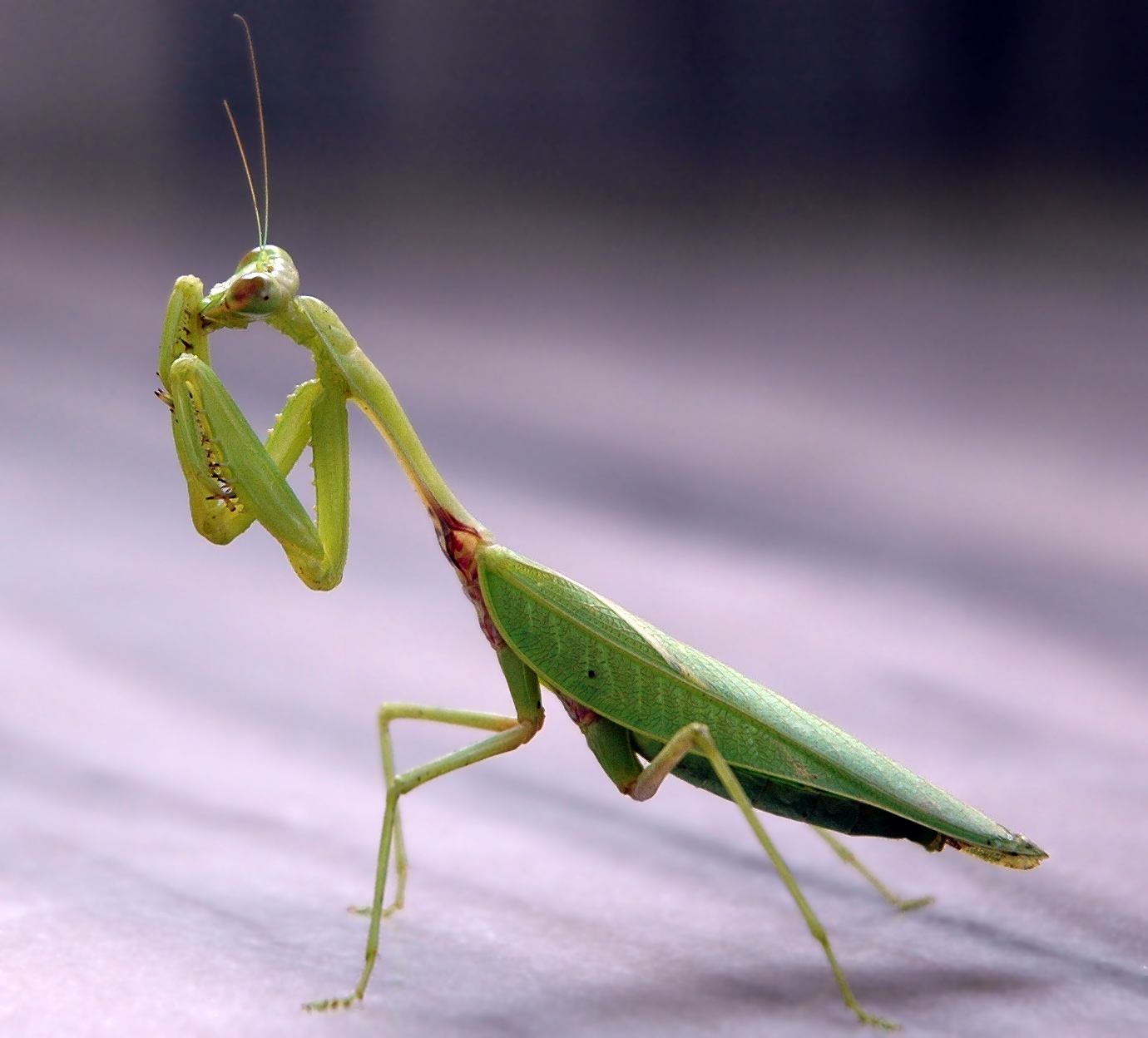
Adult female
