= Hierodula sorongana =

Scientific classification
- Kingdom: Animalia
- Phylum: Arthropoda
- Class: Insecta
- Order: Mantodea
- Family: Mantidae
- Subfamily: Hierodulinae
- Tribe: Hierodulini
- Genus: Hierodula
- Species: H. sorongana

Binomial name
- Hierodula sorongana Giglio-Tos, 1912

Species of praying mantis

Hierodula sorongana is a species of praying mantis in the family Mantidae.

== Subspecies ==
These two subspecies belong to the species Hierodula sorongana:

- Hierodula sorongana sorongana Giglio-Tos, 1912
- Hierodula sorongana squalida Beier, 1965
