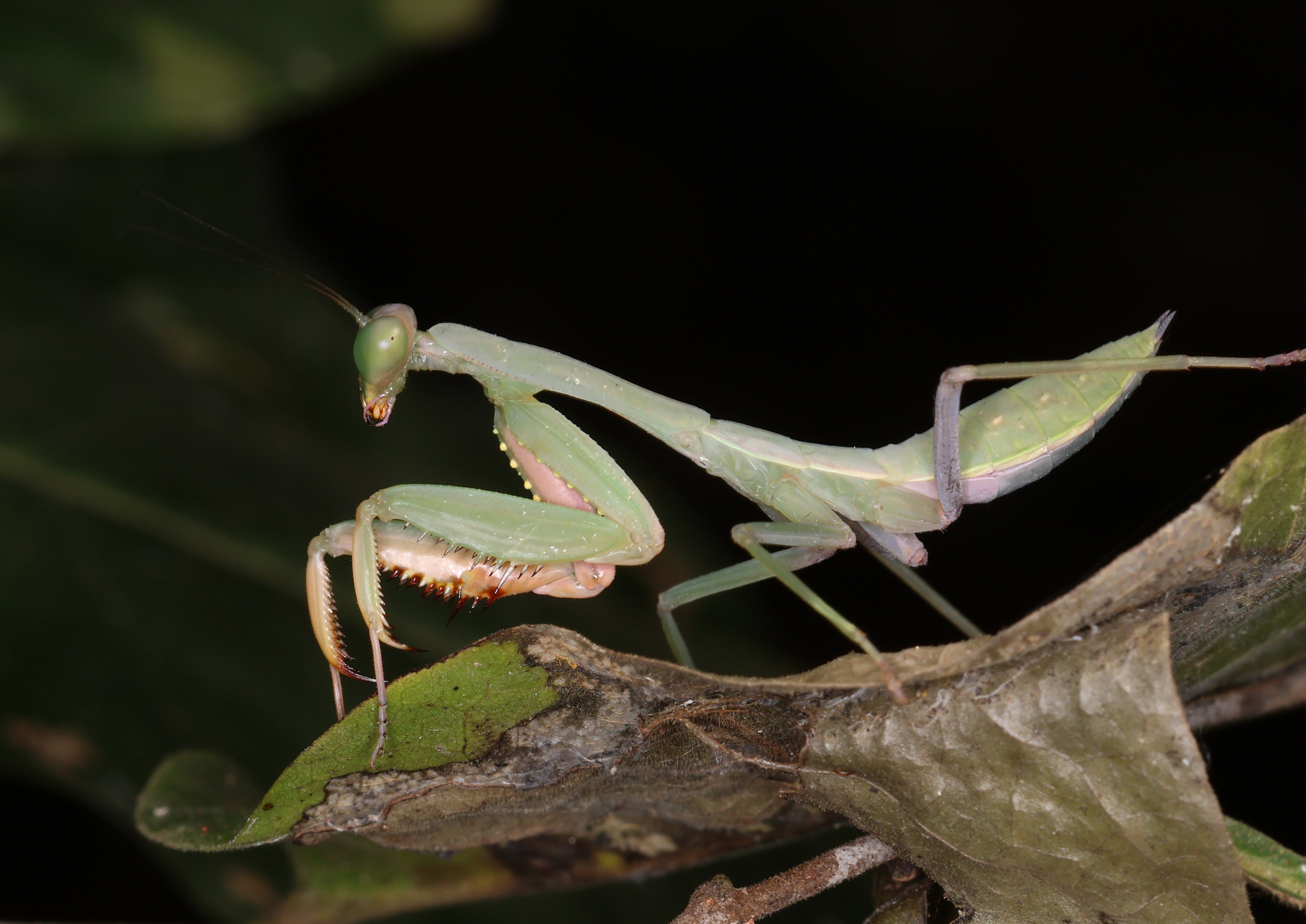

Scientific classification
- Kingdom: Animalia
- Phylum: Arthropoda
- Clade: Pancrustacea
- Class: Insecta
- Order: Mantodea
- Family: Mantidae
- Subfamily: Hierodulinae
- Tribe: Hierodulini
- Genus: Hierodula
- Species: H. werneri

Binomial name
- Hierodula werneri Giglio-Tos, 1912

= Hierodula werneri =

Species of praying mantis

Hierodula werneri is a species of praying mantis in the family Mantidae.

== Subspecies ==
These two subspecies belong to the species Hierodula werneri:

- Hierodula werneri curvidens Werner, 1911
- Hierodula werneri werneri Giglio-Tos, 1912
