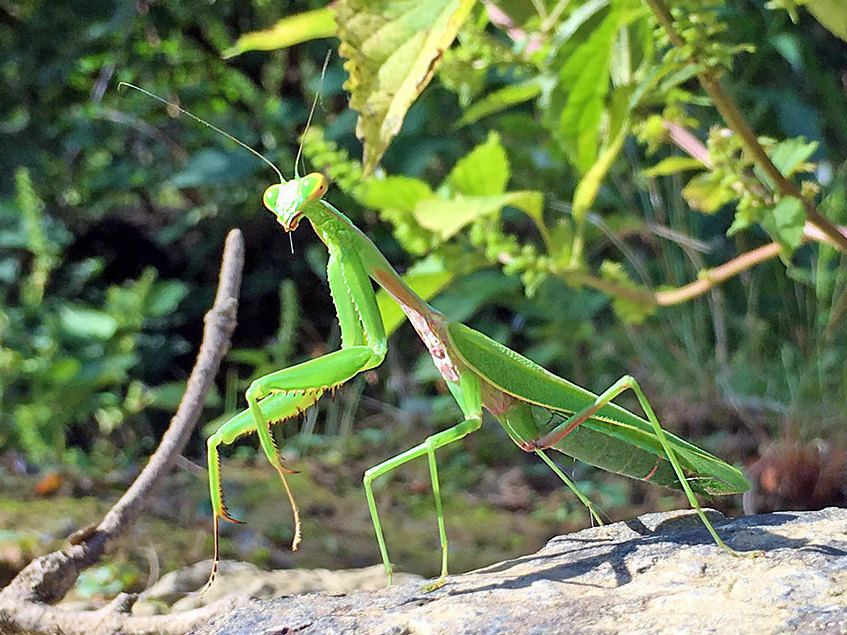

Scientific classification
- Kingdom: Animalia
- Phylum: Arthropoda
- Class: Insecta
- Order: Mantodea
- Family: Mantidae
- Subfamily: Hierodulinae
- Tribe: Hierodulini
- Genus: Hierodula
- Species: H. chinensis

Binomial name
- Hierodula chinensis Werner, 1929

= Hierodula chinensis =

Species of praying mantis

Hierodula chinensis, the Chinese reddish mantis, is a species of praying mantis in the family Mantidae.

== Distribution ==
H. chinensis occurs in central to southern China, and was introduced to Japan and Korea.
