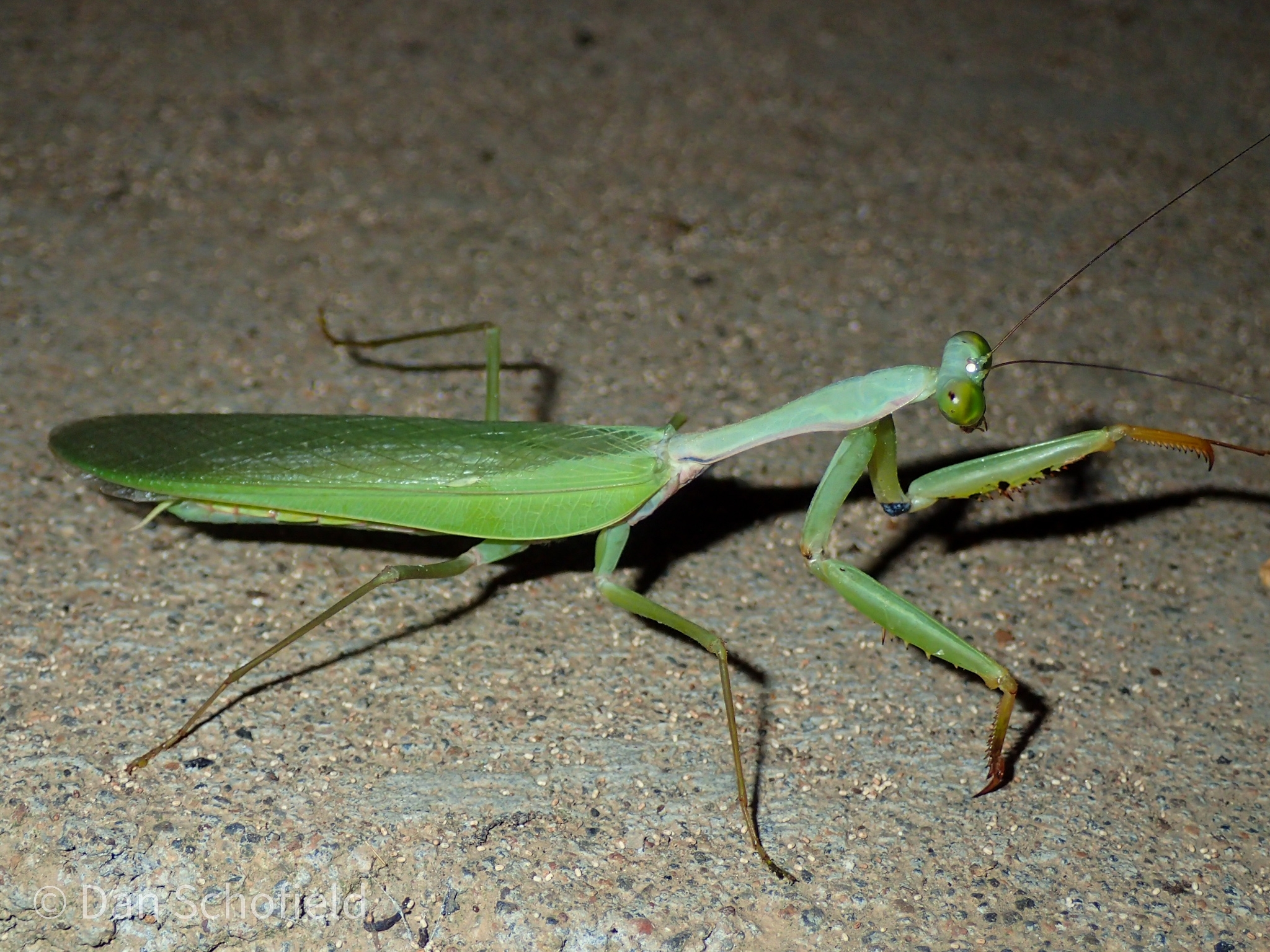

Scientific classification
- Kingdom: Animalia
- Phylum: Arthropoda
- Clade: Pancrustacea
- Class: Insecta
- Order: Mantodea
- Family: Mantidae
- Subfamily: Hierodulinae
- Tribe: Hierodulini
- Genus: Hierodula
- Species: H. purpurescens

Binomial name
- Hierodula purpurescens Brunner v.W., 1898

= Hierodula purpurescens =

Species of praying mantis

Hierodula purpurescens is a species of praying mantis in the family Mantidae.
