= Hierodula aruana =

Scientific classification
- Kingdom: Animalia
- Phylum: Arthropoda
- Clade: Pancrustacea
- Class: Insecta
- Order: Mantodea
- Family: Mantidae
- Subfamily: Hierodulinae
- Tribe: Hierodulini
- Genus: Hierodula
- Species: H. aruana

Binomial name
- Hierodula aruana Westwood, 1889

Synonyms
- Hierodula tertiata Brunner v.W., 1898

Species of praying mantis

Hierodula aruana is a species of praying mantis in the family Mantidae.

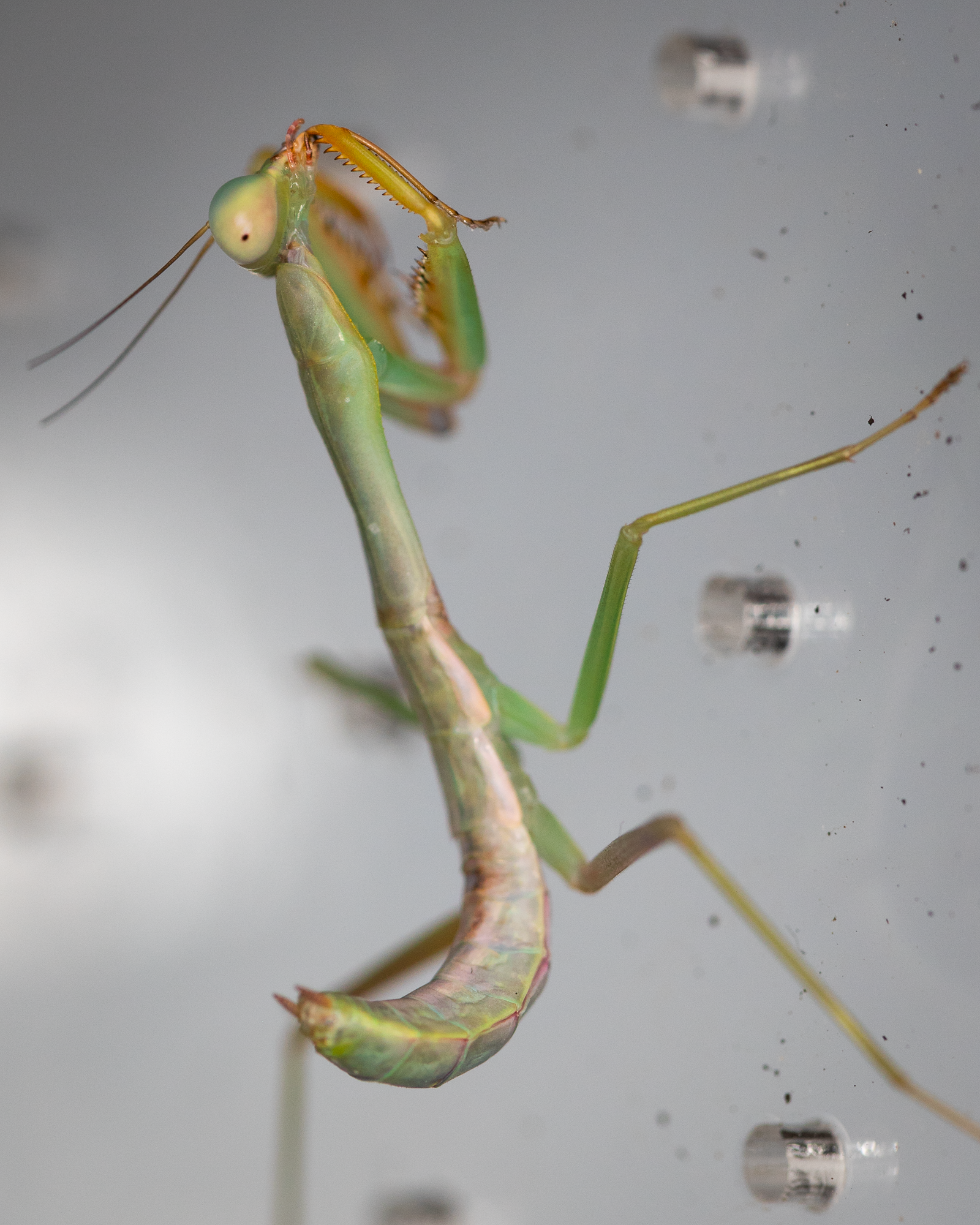
Hierodula aruana
