= Ephierodula excellens =

Scientific classification
- Kingdom: Animalia
- Phylum: Arthropoda
- Clade: Pancrustacea
- Class: Insecta
- Order: Mantodea
- Family: Mantidae
- Genus: Hierodula
- Species: E. excellens

Binomial name
- Ephierodula excellens Werner, 1916

Synonyms
- Hierodula excellens (Werner, 1916)

Species of praying mantis

Ephierodula excellens is a species of praying mantis that may be endemic to Vietnam.
