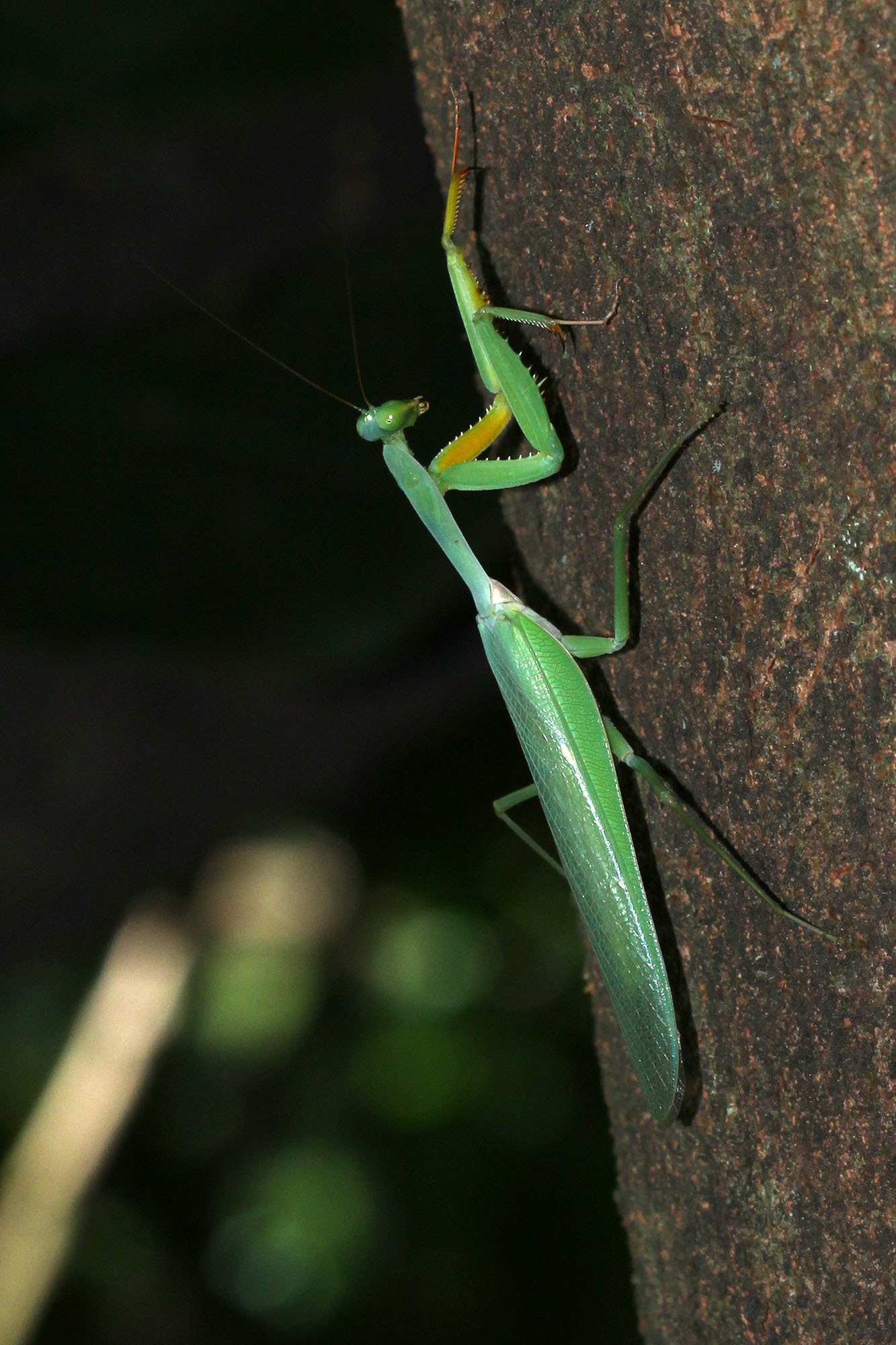

Scientific classification
- Kingdom: Animalia
- Phylum: Arthropoda
- Clade: Pancrustacea
- Class: Insecta
- Order: Mantodea
- Family: Mantidae
- Subfamily: Hierodulinae
- Tribe: Hierodulini
- Genus: Hierodula
- Species: H. venosa

Binomial name
- Hierodula venosa Olivier, 1792

Synonyms
- Hierodula athene Rehn, 1909; Hierodula bankae Giebel, 1861; Hierodula conspurcata Lichtenstein, 1796; Hierodula daphne Stal, 1877; Hierodula hybrida Burmeister, 1838; Hierodula novemdentata Saussure, 1869; Hierodula punctata Stoll, 1813; Hierodula vitrea Stoll, 1813

= Hierodula venosa =

Species of praying mantis

Hierodula venosa is a species of praying mantis in the family Mantidae.

== Gallery ==
H. venosa eating

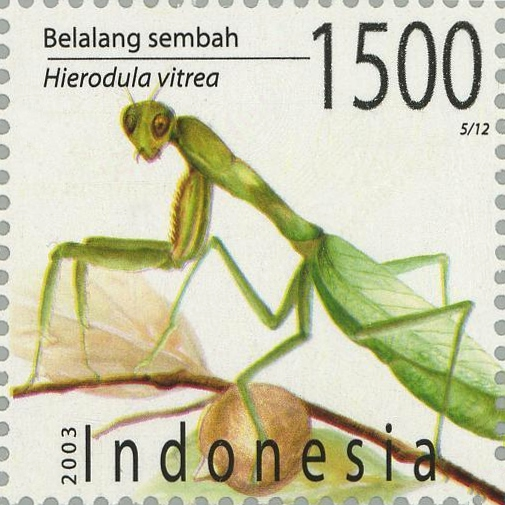
Indonesian stamp of H. venosa (syn. H. vitrea)
