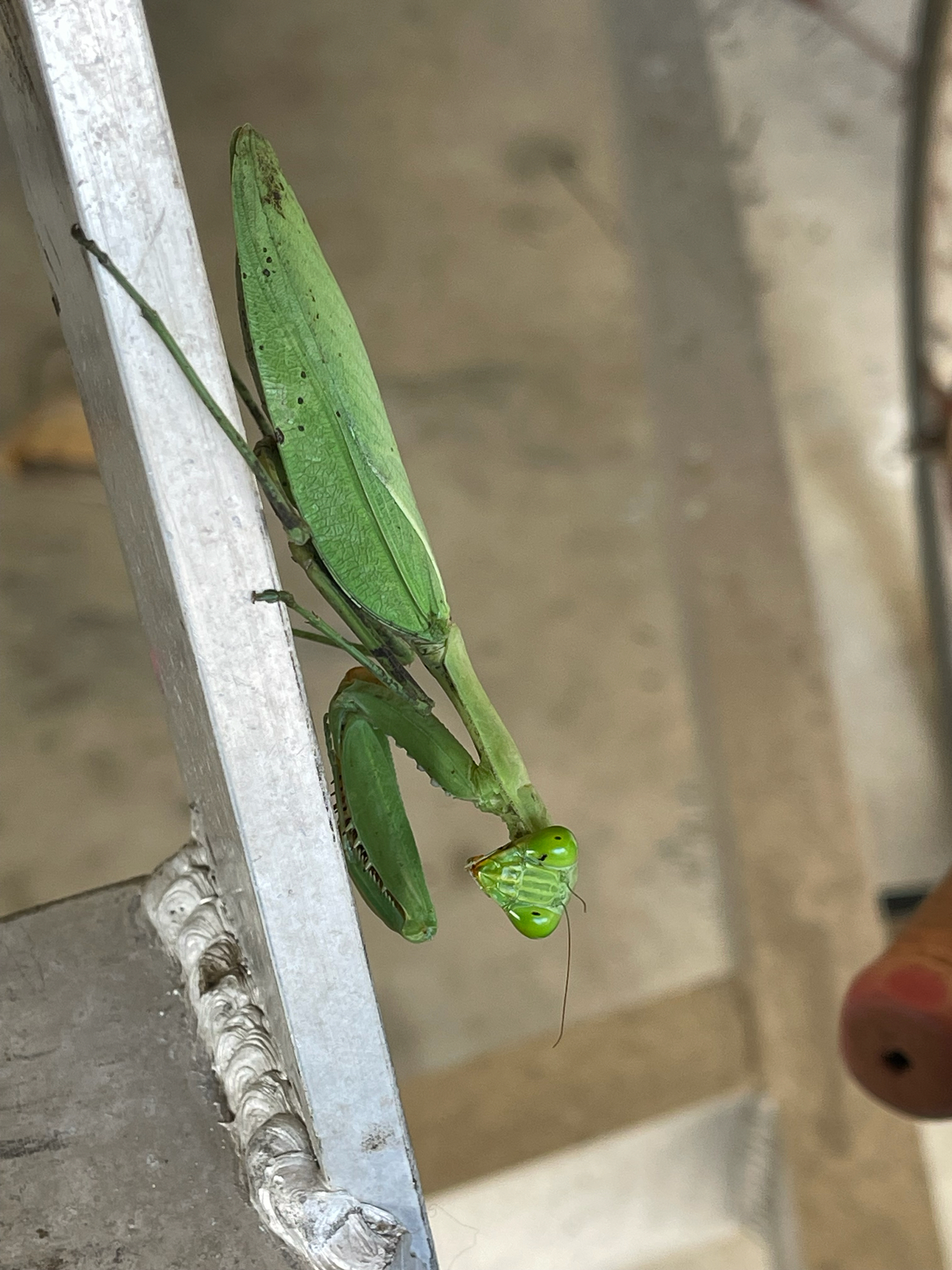

Scientific classification
- Kingdom: Animalia
- Phylum: Arthropoda
- Clade: Pancrustacea
- Class: Insecta
- Order: Mantodea
- Family: Mantidae
- Subfamily: Hierodulinae
- Tribe: Hierodulini
- Genus: Hierodula
- Species: H. pustulifera

Binomial name
- Hierodula pustulifera Wood-Mason, 1878

= Hierodula pustulifera =

Species of praying mantis

Hierodula pustulifera is a species of praying mantis in the family Mantidae.
