= Hierodula sternosticta =

Scientific classification
- Domain: Eukaryota
- Kingdom: Animalia
- Phylum: Arthropoda
- Class: Insecta
- Order: Mantodea
- Family: Mantidae
- Subfamily: Hierodulinae
- Tribe: Hierodulini
- Genus: Hierodula
- Species: H. sternosticta

Binomial name
- Hierodula sternosticta Wood-Mason, 1882

Species of insect

Hierodula sternosticta is a species of praying mantis in the family Mantidae.

== Subspecies ==
These two subspecies belong to the species Hierodula sternosticta:

- Hierodula sternosticta coxalis Werner, 1932
- Hierodula sternosticta sternosticta Wood-Mason, 1882
