= Hierodula doveri =

Scientific classification
- Kingdom: Animalia
- Phylum: Arthropoda
- Clade: Pancrustacea
- Class: Insecta
- Order: Mantodea
- Family: Mantidae
- Subfamily: Hierodulinae
- Tribe: Hierodulini
- Genus: Hierodula
- Species: H. doveri

Binomial name
- Hierodula doveri Chopard, 1924

Species of praying mantis

Hierodula doveri is a species of praying mantis in the family Mantidae. Their habitat is West Bengal, India

== Distribution ==
This species is found in the Indian states of Karnataka, Kerala, Orissa, Maharashtra, Tamil Nadu, and West Bengal.
