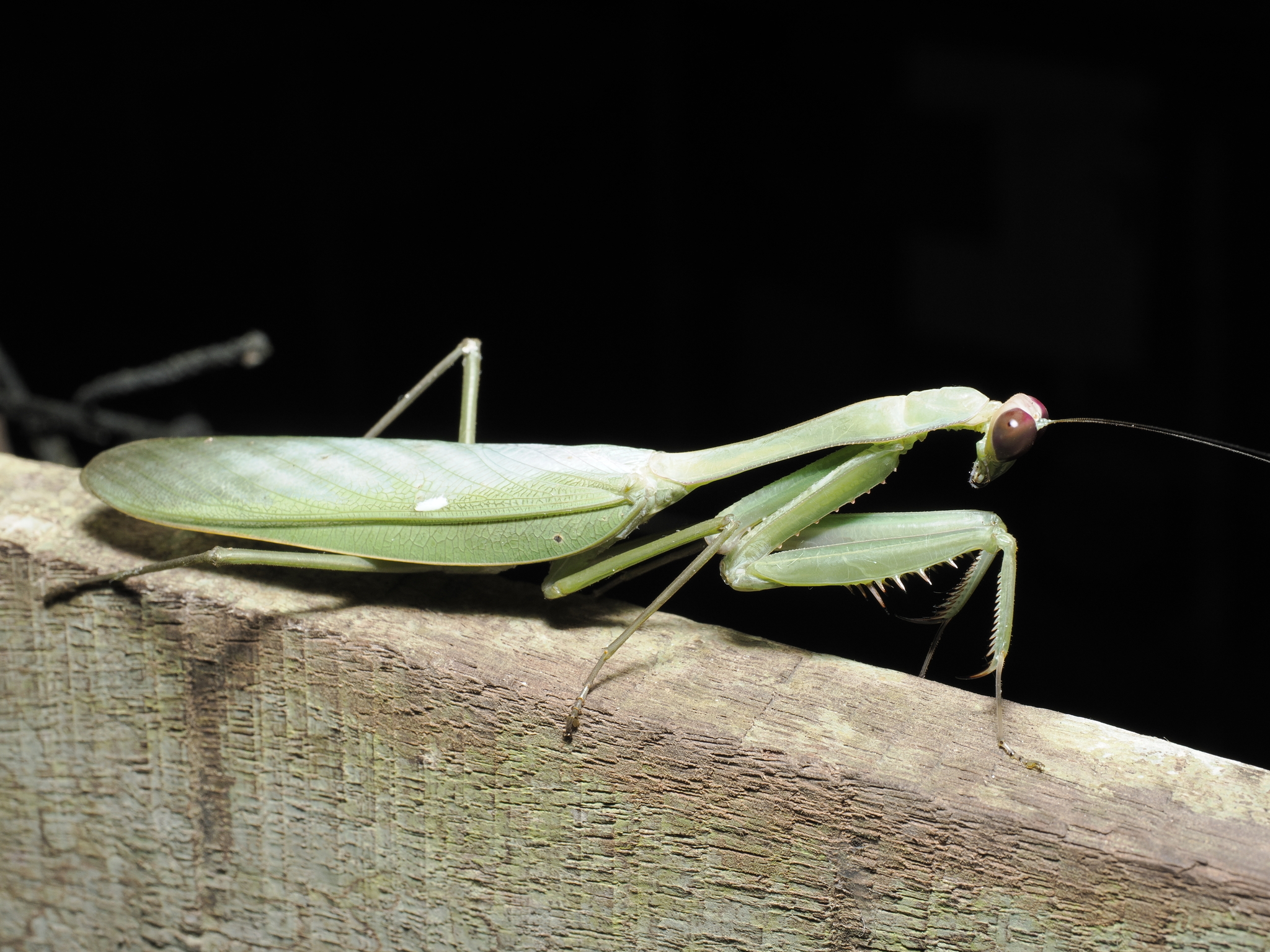

Scientific classification
- Kingdom: Animalia
- Phylum: Arthropoda
- Clade: Pancrustacea
- Class: Insecta
- Order: Mantodea
- Family: Mantidae
- Subfamily: Hierodulinae
- Tribe: Hierodulini
- Genus: Hierodula
- Species: H. dyaka

Binomial name
- Hierodula dyaka Westwood, 1889

= Hierodula dyaka =

Species of praying mantis

Hierodula dyaka is a species of praying mantis in the family Mantidae.
