= Hierodula ingens =

Scientific classification
- Domain: Eukaryota
- Kingdom: Animalia
- Phylum: Arthropoda
- Class: Insecta
- Order: Mantodea
- Family: Mantidae
- Subfamily: Hierodulinae
- Tribe: Hierodulini
- Genus: Hierodula
- Species: H. ingens

Binomial name
- Hierodula ingens Werner, 1911

Species of praying mantis

Hierodula ingens is a species of praying mantis in the family Mantidae.
