= Hierodula modesta =

Scientific classification
- Domain: Eukaryota
- Kingdom: Animalia
- Phylum: Arthropoda
- Class: Insecta
- Order: Mantodea
- Family: Mantidae
- Subfamily: Hierodulinae
- Tribe: Hierodulini
- Genus: Hierodula
- Species: H. modesta

Binomial name
- Hierodula modesta Brunner v.W., 1898

Species of praying mantis

Hierodula modesta is a species of praying mantis in the family Mantidae.

== Subspecies ==
These two subspecies belong to the species Hierodula modesta:

- Hierodula modesta dentata Beier, 1942
- Hierodula modesta modesta Brunner v.W., 1898
