= Hierodula tonkinensis =

Scientific classification
- Kingdom: Animalia
- Phylum: Arthropoda
- Clade: Pancrustacea
- Class: Insecta
- Order: Mantodea
- Family: Mantidae
- Subfamily: Hierodulinae
- Tribe: Hierodulini
- Genus: Hierodula
- Species: H. tonkinensis

Binomial name
- Hierodula tonkinensis Beier, 1935

Species of praying mantis

Hierodula tonkinensis is a praying mantis species in the tribe Paramantini.

This species may be endemic to Vietnam.
