= Hierodula cuchingina =

Scientific classification
- Kingdom: Animalia
- Phylum: Arthropoda
- Class: Insecta
- Order: Mantodea
- Family: Mantidae
- Subfamily: Hierodulinae
- Tribe: Hierodulini
- Genus: Hierodula
- Species: H. cuchingina

Binomial name
- Hierodula cuchingina Giglio-Tos, 1917

Species of praying mantis

Hierodula cuchingina is a species of praying mantis in the family Mantidae.
