= Hierodula pulchripes =

Scientific classification
- Domain: Eukaryota
- Kingdom: Animalia
- Phylum: Arthropoda
- Class: Insecta
- Order: Mantodea
- Family: Mantidae
- Subfamily: Hierodulinae
- Tribe: Hierodulini
- Genus: Hierodula
- Species: H. pulchripes

Binomial name
- Hierodula pulchripes Werner, 1930

Species of praying mantis

Hierodula pulchripes is a species of praying mantis in the family Mantidae.
