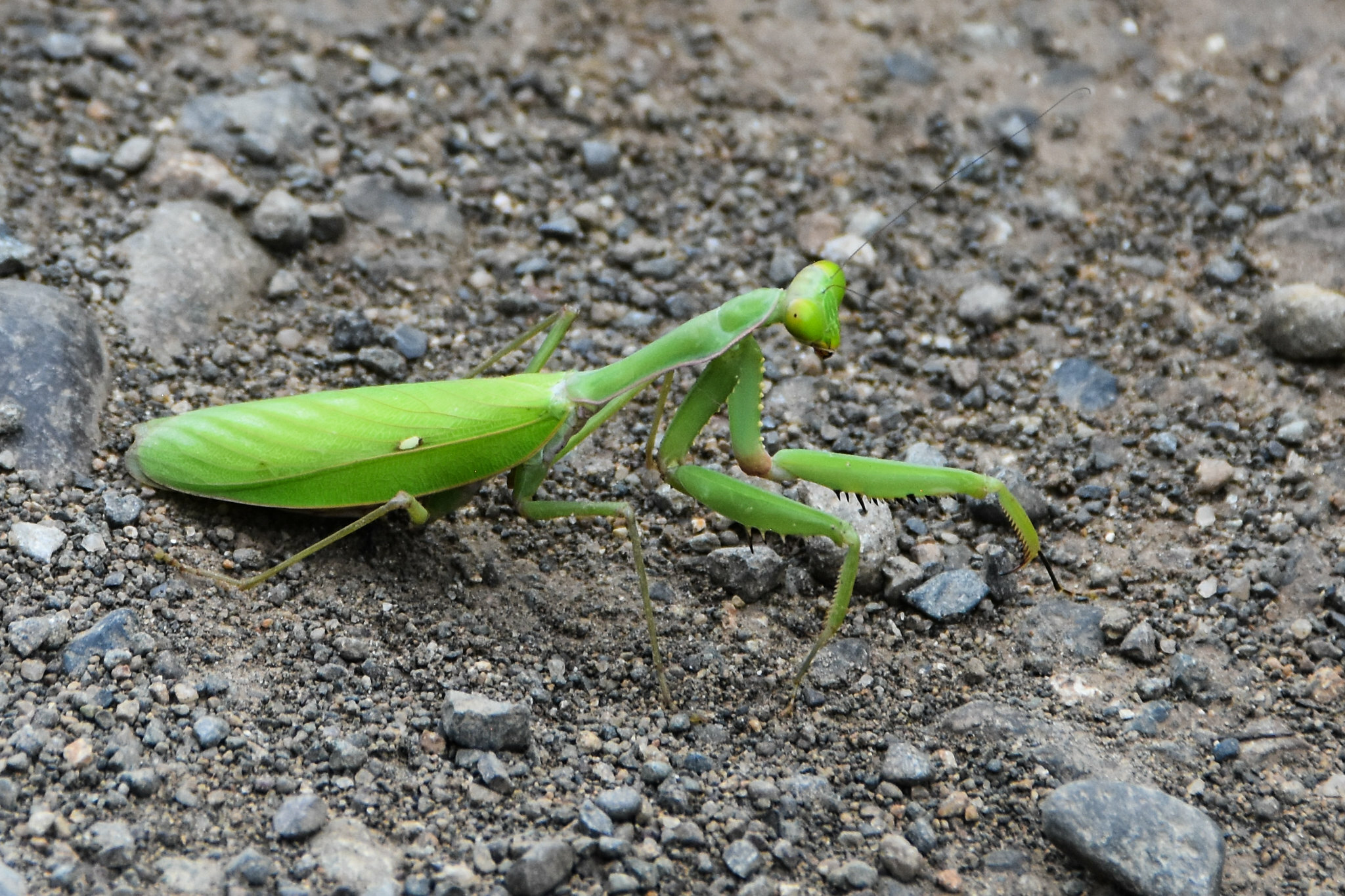

Scientific classification
- Kingdom: Animalia
- Phylum: Arthropoda
- Clade: Pancrustacea
- Class: Insecta
- Order: Mantodea
- Family: Mantidae
- Subfamily: Hierodulinae
- Tribe: Hierodulini
- Genus: Hierodula
- Species: H. ralumina

Binomial name
- Hierodula ralumina Giglio-Tos, 1917

= Hierodula ralumina =

Species of praying mantis

Hierodula ralumina is a species of praying mantis in the family Mantidae.
