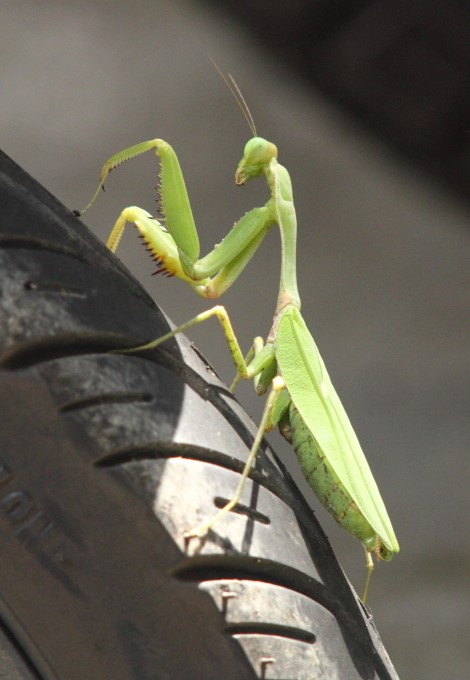

Scientific classification
- Kingdom: Animalia
- Phylum: Arthropoda
- Clade: Pancrustacea
- Class: Insecta
- Order: Mantodea
- Family: Mantidae
- Subfamily: Hierodulinae
- Tribe: Hierodulini
- Genus: Hierodula
- Species: H. quinquepatellata

Binomial name
- Hierodula quinquepatellata Werner, 1911

Synonyms
- Hierodula sapitina Giglio-Tos, 1912

= Hierodula quinquepatellata =

Species of praying mantis

Hierodula quinquepatellata is a species of praying mantis in the family Mantidae. This insect is found in Lombok, Sumbawa and Flores.
