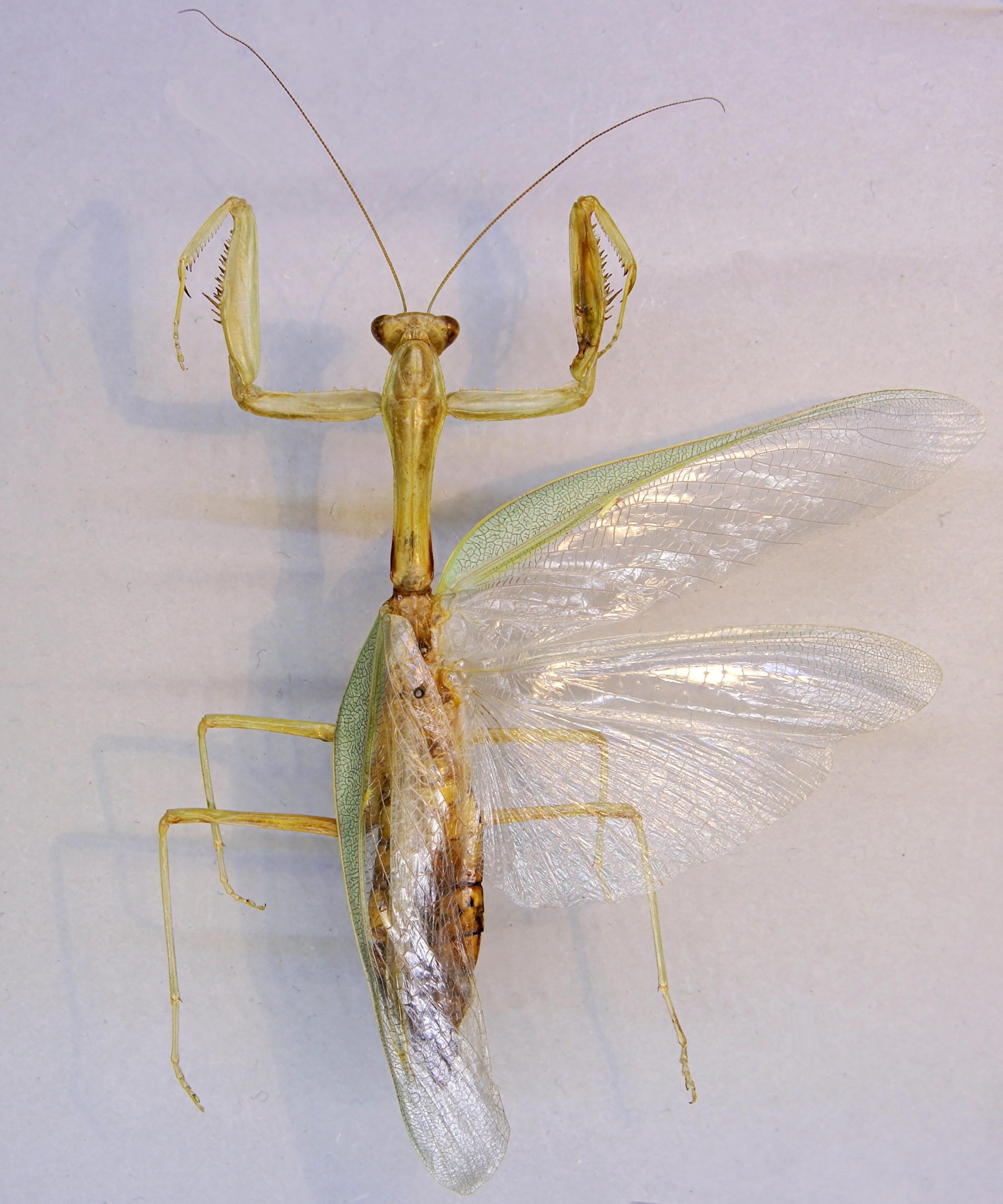

Scientific classification
- Kingdom: Animalia
- Phylum: Arthropoda
- Clade: Pancrustacea
- Class: Insecta
- Order: Mantodea
- Family: Mantidae
- Subfamily: Hierodulinae
- Tribe: Hierodulini
- Genus: Hierodula
- Species: H. unimaculata

Binomial name
- Hierodula unimaculata Olivier, 1792

Synonyms
- Hierodula notata Stoll, 1813

= Hierodula unimaculata =

Species of praying mantis

Hierodula unimaculata is an Asian praying mantis species in the tribe Paramantini.
