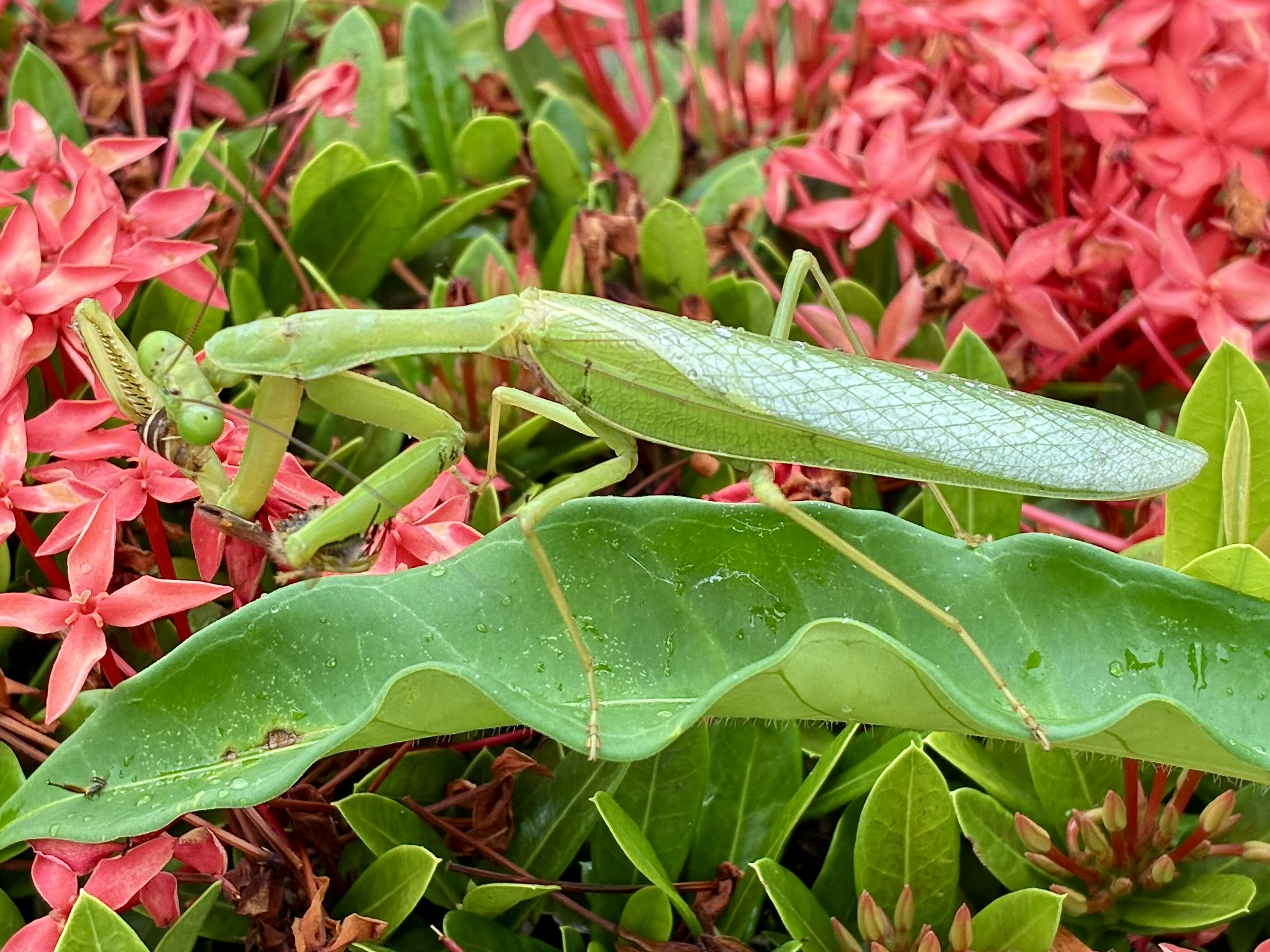

Scientific classification
- Kingdom: Animalia
- Phylum: Arthropoda
- Clade: Pancrustacea
- Class: Insecta
- Order: Mantodea
- Family: Mantidae
- Subfamily: Hierodulinae
- Tribe: Hierodulini
- Genus: Hierodula
- Species: H. schultzei

Binomial name
- Hierodula schultzei Giglio-Tos, 1912

= Hierodula schultzei =

Species of praying mantis

Hierodula schultzei is a species of praying mantis in the family Mantidae.

== Subspecies ==
These two subspecies belong to the species Hierodula schultzei:

- Hierodula schultzei brevis Giglio-Tos, 1912
- Hierodula schultzei schultzei Giglio-Tos, 1912
