= Hierodula quinquecallosa =

Scientific classification
- Kingdom: Animalia
- Phylum: Arthropoda
- Clade: Pancrustacea
- Class: Insecta
- Order: Mantodea
- Family: Mantidae
- Genus: Hierodula
- Species: H. quinquecallosa

Binomial name
- Hierodula quinquecallosa (Werner, 1916)

Synonyms
- Sphodromantis quinquecallosa Werner, 1916

Species of praying mantis

Sphodromantis quinquecallosa is a species of praying mantis found in Africa.

== See also ==
- African mantis
- List of mantis genera and species
