= Hierodula trimacula =

Scientific classification
- Kingdom: Animalia
- Phylum: Arthropoda
- Clade: Pancrustacea
- Class: Insecta
- Order: Mantodea
- Family: Mantidae
- Genus: Hierodula
- Species: H. trimacula

Binomial name
- Hierodula trimacula (Saussure, 1870)

Synonyms
- Sphodromantis trimacula Saussure, 1870

Species of praying mantis

Hierodula trimacula is a species of praying mantis found in Iraq, Iran, Saudi Arabia, Oman, and Yemen.

== See also ==
- African mantis
- List of mantis genera and species
