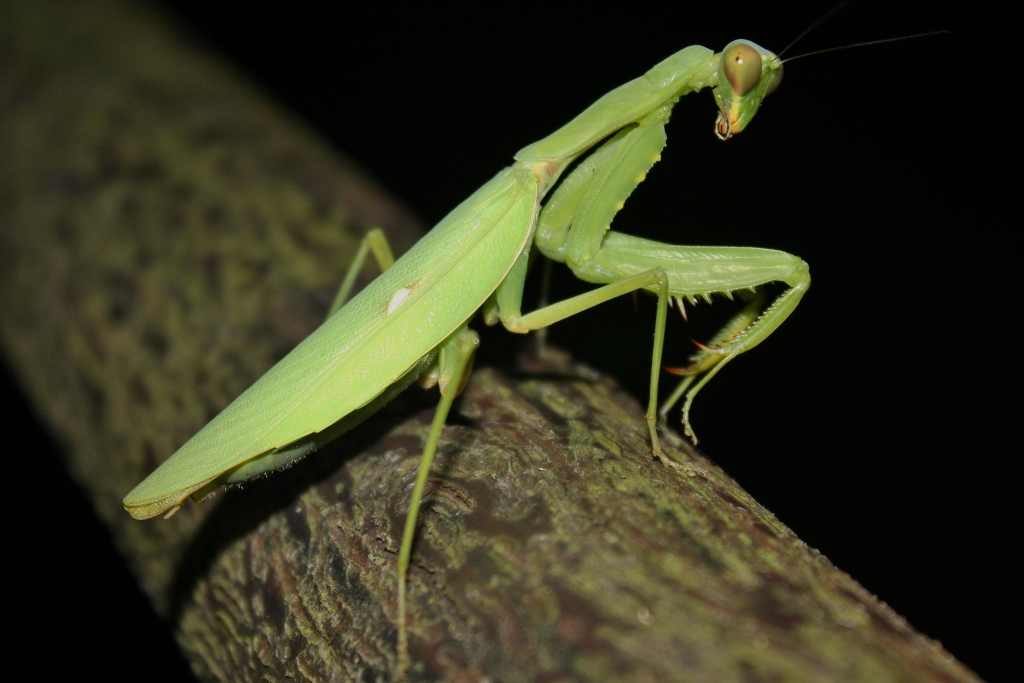
- unidentified Hierodula species

Scientific classification
- Kingdom: Animalia
- Phylum: Arthropoda
- Clade: Pancrustacea
- Class: Insecta
- Order: Mantodea
- Family: Mantidae
- Tribe: Hierodulini
- Genus: Hierodula; Burmeister, 1838

Species
- see text

Synonyms
- Ephierodula Giglio-Tos, 1912; Parhierodula Giglio-Tos, 1912; Rhomboderula Giglio-Tos, 1912

= Hierodula =

Genus of praying mantises

Hierodula is a genus of praying mantises in the tribe Hierodulini, found throughout Asia. Many species are referred to by the common name giant Asian mantis because of their large size compared to other mantises. Their large size and vibrant coloration make Hierodula mantises popular in the pet trade. Some widespread species include H. membranacea and H. patellifera.

The traditional conception of the genus is now considered a 'catch all' and is currently subject to review and taxonomic revision; three species were moved to the new genus Titanodula in 2020, and a 2022 genetic and morphological study suggested that most of the species in Hierodula should be moved to other genera in the tribe Hierodulini, such as: Rhombodera (for the Hierodula chinensis clade), Tamolanica (for the Hierodula majuscula clade) and Rhombomantis (for the Hierodula patellifera clade); as well as potentially new genera. This is because the type species of Hierodula is Hierodula membranacea, so only the species closest to it should be considered “true” Hierodula.

== Species ==
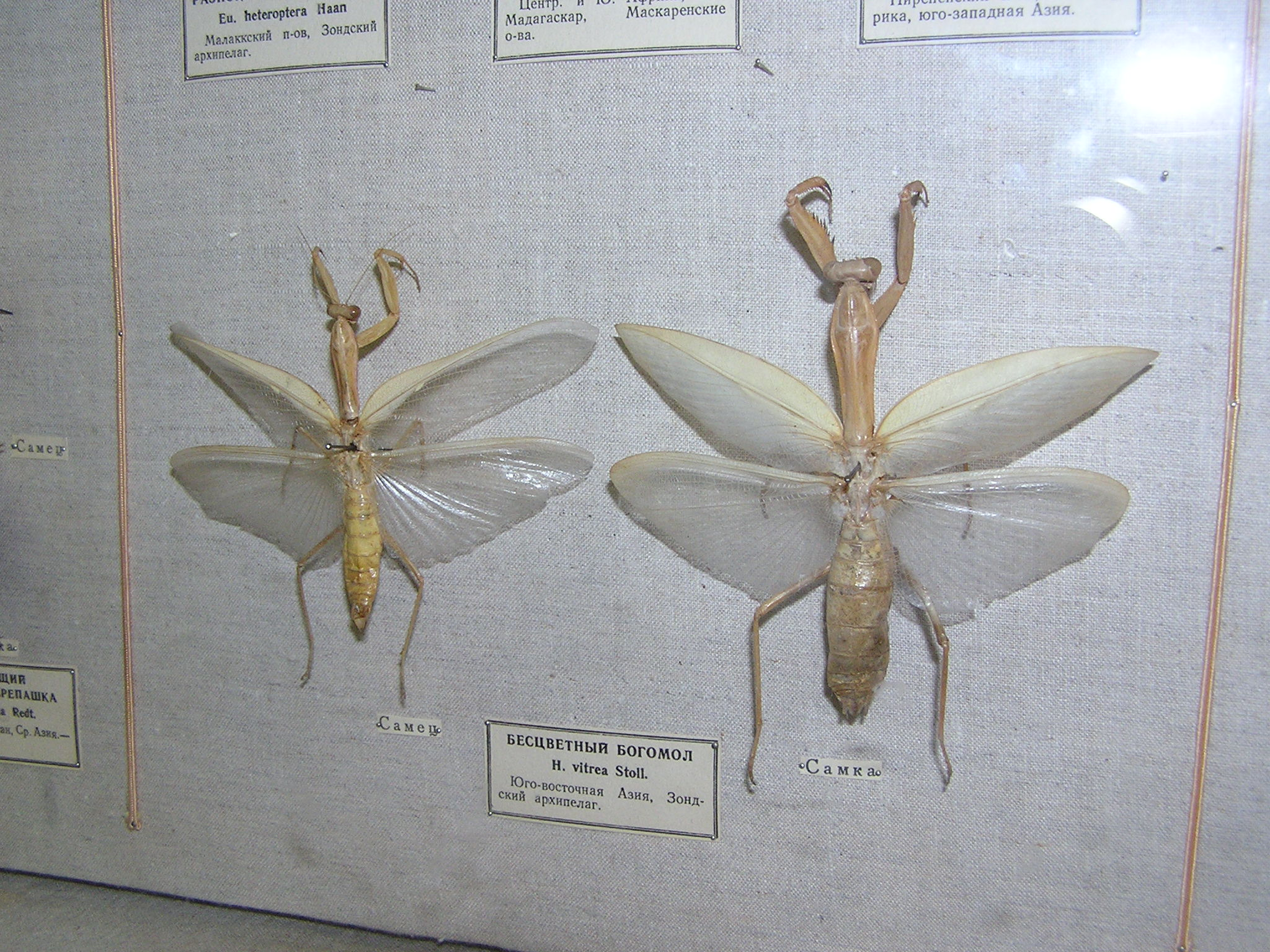
H. vitrea in the Saint Petersburg Zoological Museum

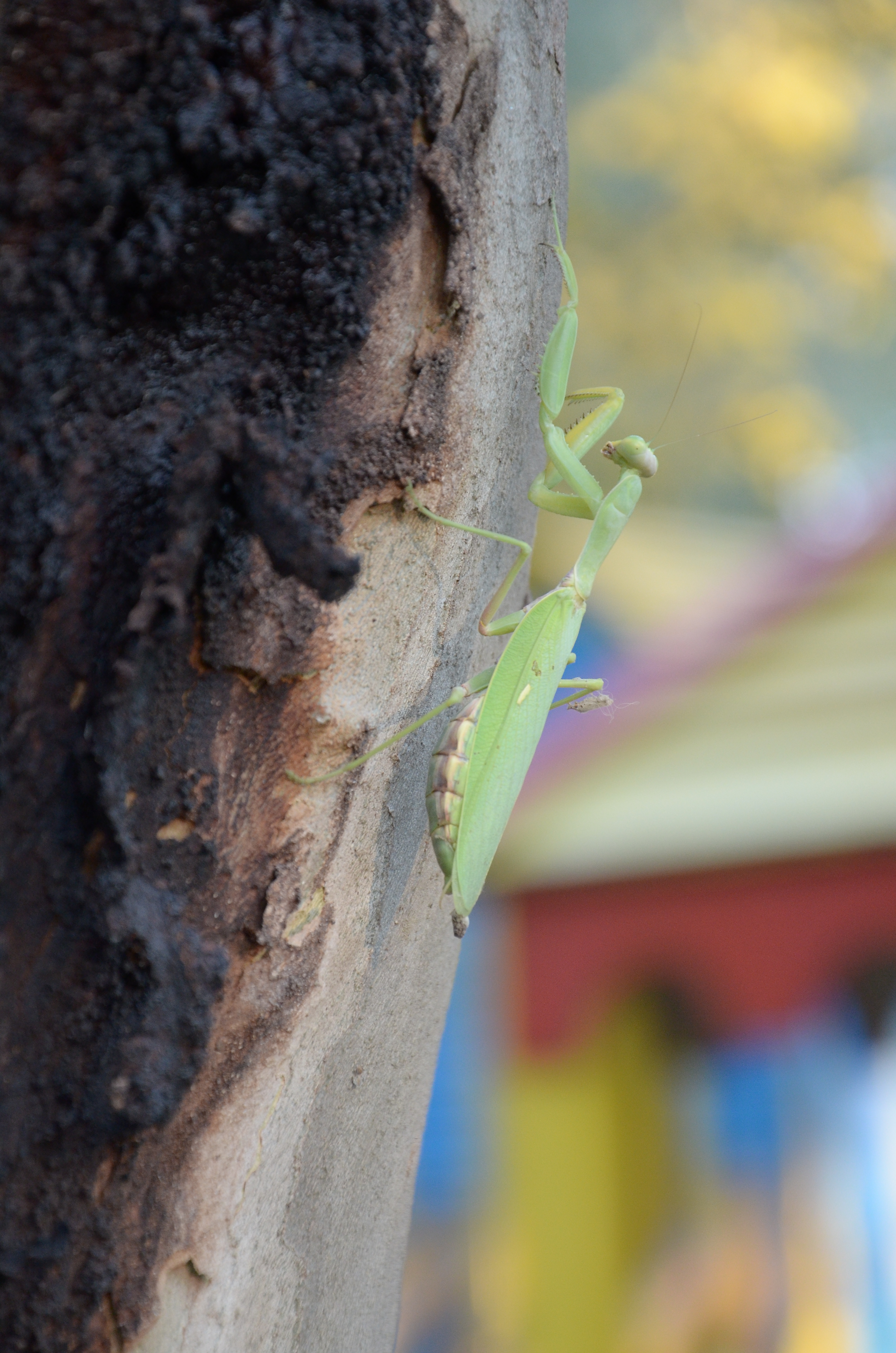
Hierodula trancaucasica

- Hierodula ansusana
- Hierodula aruana
- Hierodula assamensis
- Hierodula atrocoxata
- Hierodula beieri
- Hierodula bhamoana
- Hierodula biaka
- Hierodula borneana
- Hierodula brunnea
- Hierodula chinensis
- Hierodula coarctata
- Hierodula confusa
- Hierodula crassa
- Hierodula cuchingina
- Hierodula dolichoptera
- Hierodula doveri
- Hierodula dyaka
- Hierodula everetti
- Hierodula fumipennis
- Hierodula fuscescens
- Hierodula gigliotosi
- Hierodula gracilicollis
- Hierodula harpyia
- Hierodula heinrichi
- Hierodula inconspicua
- Hierodula ingens
- Hierodula italii
- Hierodula jobina
- Hierodula kapaurana
- Hierodula laevicollis
- Hierodula lamasonga
- Hierodula latipennis
- Hierodula longedentata
- Hierodula macrodentata
- Hierodula macrostigmata
- Hierodula maculata
- Hierodula maculisternum
- Hierodula major
- Hierodula majuscula
- Hierodula malaccana
- Hierodula malaya
- Hierodula membranacea (giant Asian mantis, Sri Lanka mantis, green mantis)
- Hierodula microdon
- Hierodula mindanensis
- Hierodula modesta
- Hierodula monochroa
- Hierodula multispinulosa
- Hierodula nicobarica
- Hierodula obiensis
- Hierodula obtusata
- Hierodula oraea
- Hierodula ovata
- Hierodula papua
- Hierodula parviceps
- Hierodula patellifera (giant Asian mantis)
- Hierodula perakana
- Hierodula philippina
- Hierodula pistillinota
- Hierodula prasipes
- Hierodula prosternalis
- Hierodula pulchra
- Hierodula pulchripes
- Hierodula purpurescens
- Hierodula pustulifera
- Hierodula pygmaea
- Hierodula quadridens
- Hierodula quadripunctata
- Hierodula quinquecallosa
- Hierodula quinquepatellata
- Hierodula rajah
- Hierodula ralumina
- Hierodula robusta
- Hierodula rufomaculata
- Hierodula rufopatellata
- Hierodula salomonis (jade mantis)
- Hierodula samangensis
- Hierodula sarsinorum
- Hierodula saussurei
- Hierodula schultzei
- Hierodula scutata
- Hierodula simbangana
- Hierodula similis
- Hierodula siporana
- Hierodula sorongana
- Hierodula sternosticta
- Hierodula stigmata
- Hierodula striata
- Hierodula striatipes
- Hierodula szentivanyi
- Hierodula tenuidentata (giant Asian mantis)
- Hierodula tenuis
- Hierodula timorensis
- Hierodula togiana
- Hierodula tonkinensis
- Hierodula tornica
- Hierodula transcaucasica
- Hierodula trimacula
- Hierodula unimaculata
- Hierodula venosa
- Hierodula ventralis
- Hierodula versicolor
- Hierodula vitreoides
- Hierodula werneri
- Hierodula westwoodi

== See also ==
- List of mantis species and genera

== Picture ==
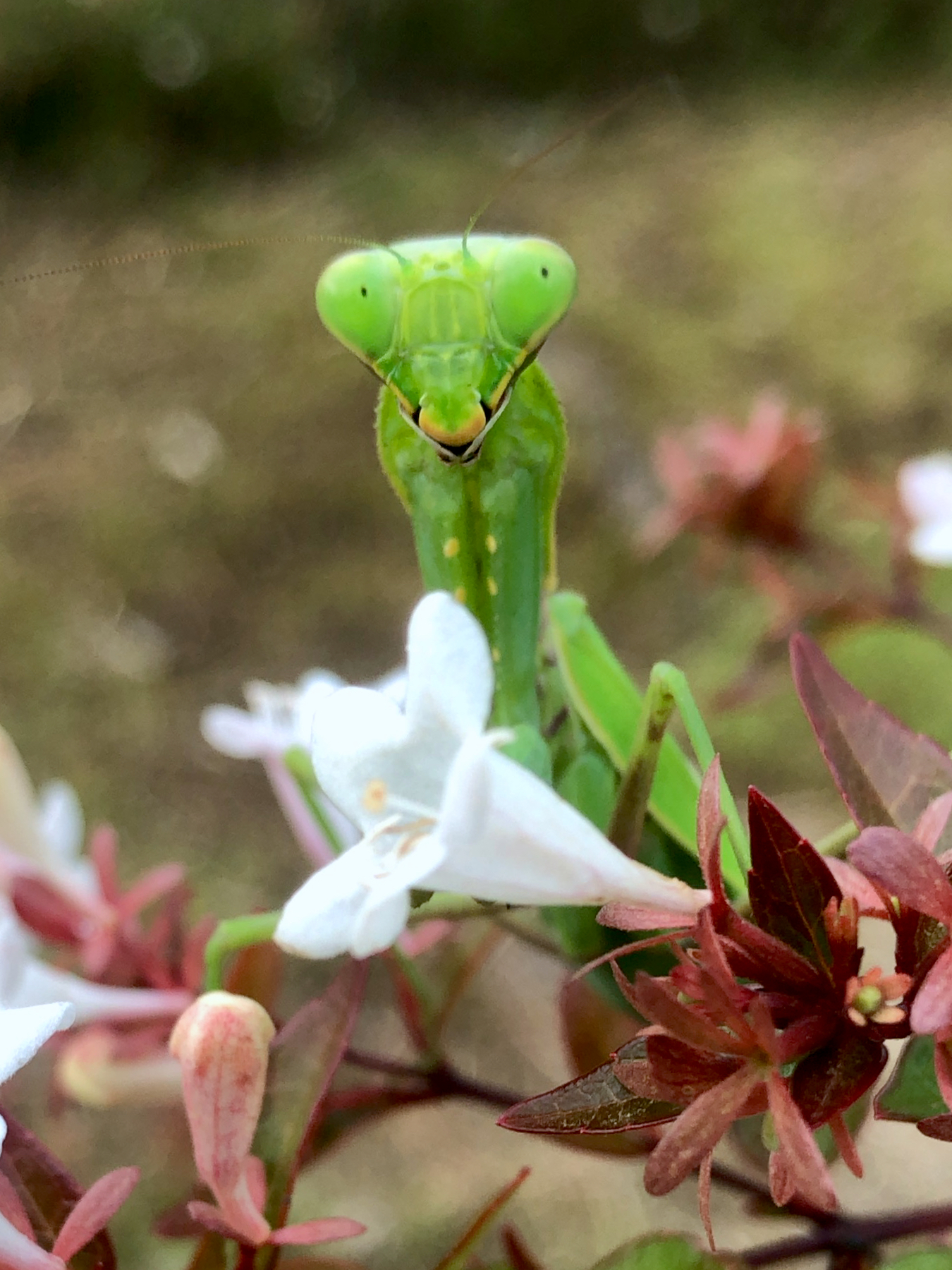

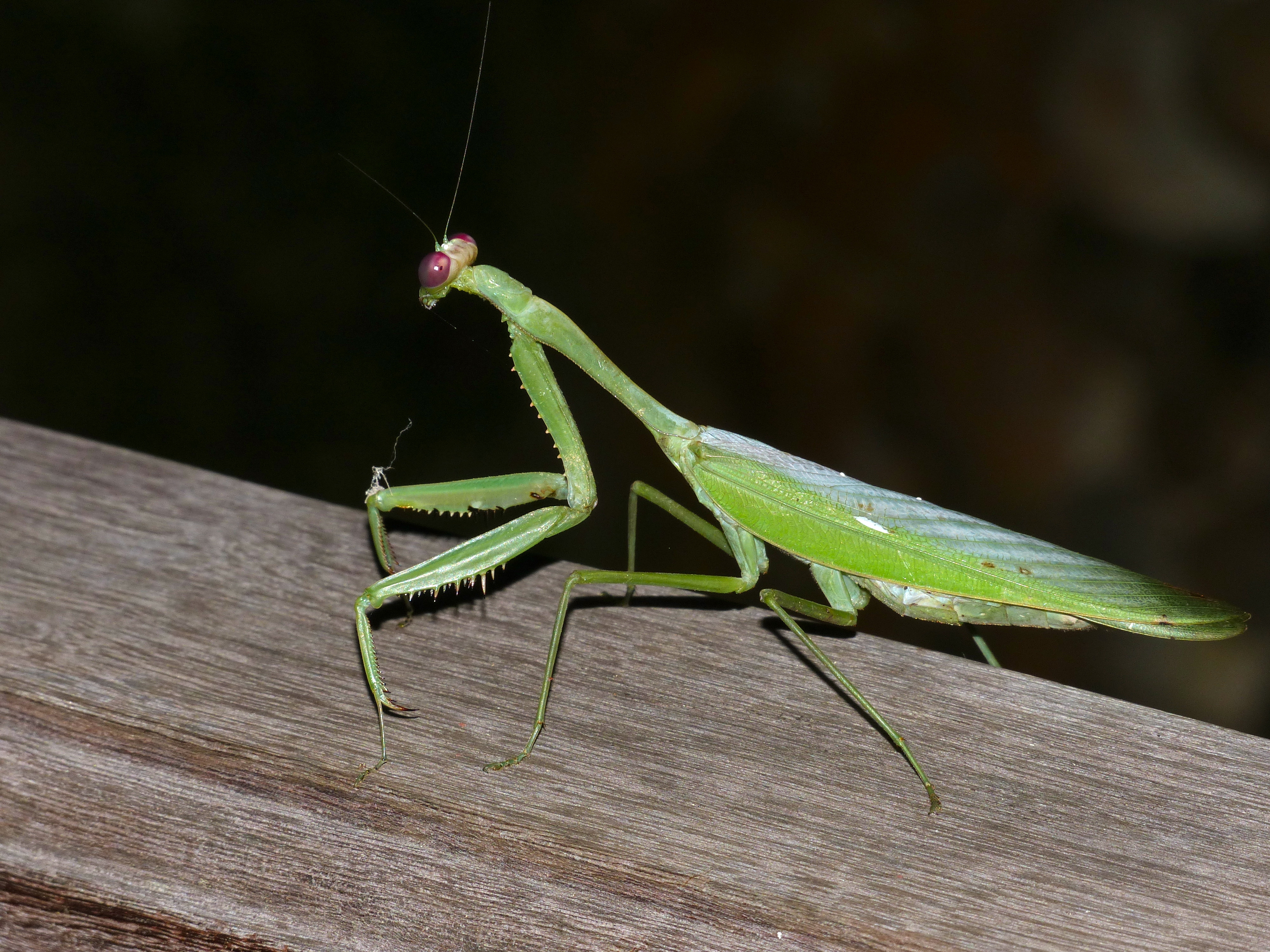

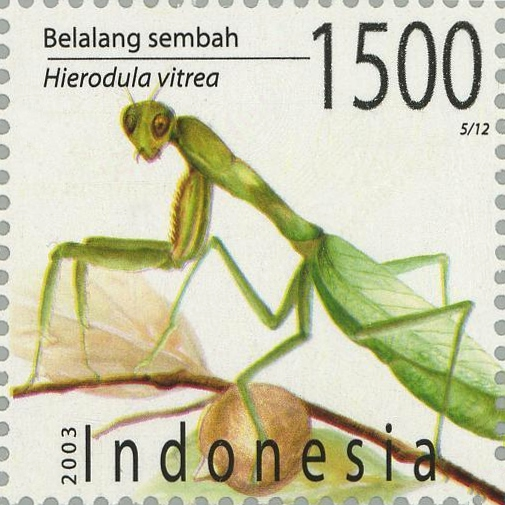
Hierodula, printed on the stamp of Indonesia.
