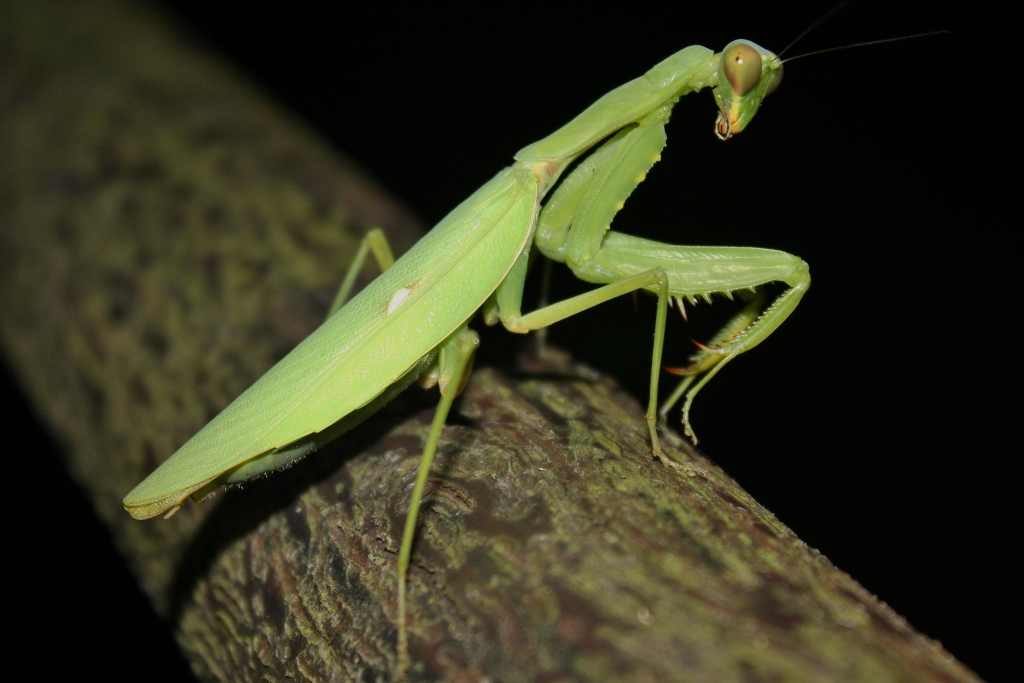
- Hierodula sp.

Scientific classification
- Kingdom: Animalia
- Phylum: Arthropoda
- Clade: Pancrustacea
- Class: Insecta
- Order: Mantodea
- Family: Mantidae
- Subfamily: Hierodulinae; Brunner von Wattenwyl, 1893

= Hierodulinae =

Subfamily of praying mantises

The Hierodulinae are a subfamily of praying mantids, established by Brunner von Wattenwyl, and restored as part of a major taxonomic revision of mantid. The subfamily now contains genera previously placed elsewhere in the family Mantidae.

The new placement means that this taxon is part of the superfamily Mantoidea (of group Cernomantodea) and infraorder Schizomantodea. Species have been recorded from: Africa, Asia and Australia.

== Tribes and genera ==
This subfamily now contains many genera that were previously placed elsewhere including the Mantinae. The Mantodea Species File lists two tribes here:

=== Archimantini ===
- subtribe Archimantina
  - Archimantis Saussure, 1869
  - Austromantis Sjostedt, 1918
  - Austrovates Sjostedt, 1918
  - Coenomantis Giglio-Tos, 1917
  - Corthylomantis Milledge, 1997
  - Nullabora Tindale, 1923
- subtribe Pseudomantina
  - Pseudomantis Saussure, 1869
- subtribe Trachymantina
  - Sphodropoda Stal, 1871
  - Trachymantis Giglio-Tos, 1917
  - Zopheromantis Tindale, 1924

=== Hierodulini ===
- Camelomantis Giglio-Tos, 1917
- Chlorocalis Stiewe, Shcherbakov & Vermeersch, 2019
- Dracomantis – monotypic D. mirofraternus Shcherbakov & Vermeersch, 2020
- Ephierodula Giglio-Tos, 1912
- Gretella – monotypic G. gracilis Werner, 1923
- Hierodula Burmeister, 1838
- Hierodulella Giglio-Tos, 1912
- Mekongomantis – monotypic M. quinquespinosa Schwarz, Ehrmann & Shcherbakov, 2018
- Pnigomantis Giglio-Tos, 1917 – monotypic P. medioconstricta Westwood, 1889
- Rhombodera Burmeister, 1838
- Rhombomantis Ehrmann & Borer, 2015
- Stictomantis Beier, 1942 – monotypic S. cinctipes Werner, 1916
- Tamolanica Werner, 1923
- Tismomorpha Roy, 1973
- Titanodula Vermeersch, 2020
