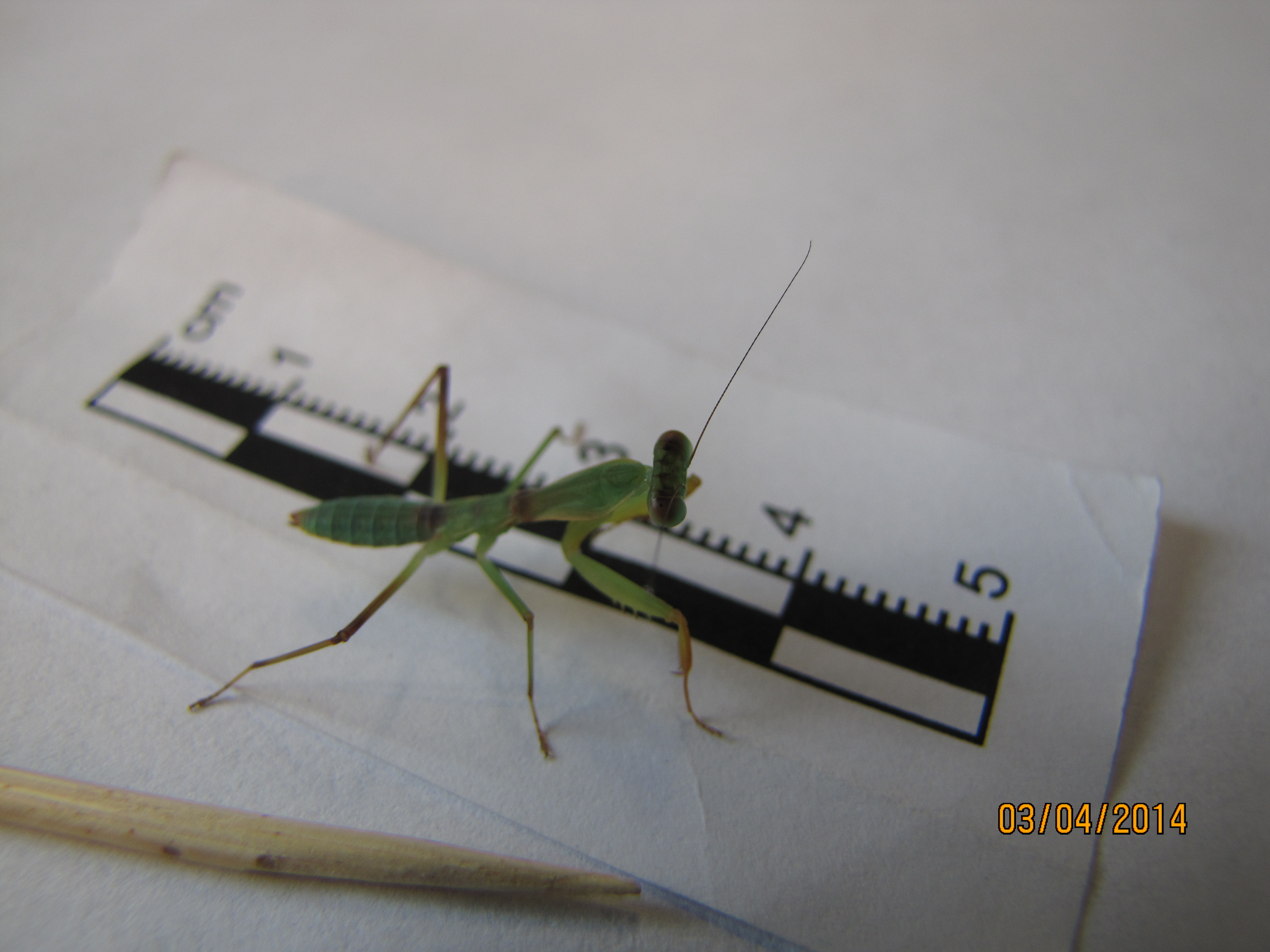
- Nymph

Scientific classification
- Kingdom: Animalia
- Phylum: Arthropoda
- Clade: Pancrustacea
- Class: Insecta
- Order: Mantodea
- Family: Mantidae
- Subfamily: Hierodulinae
- Tribe: Hierodulini
- Genus: Rhombodera
- Species: R. valida

Binomial name
- Rhombodera valida Burmeister, 1838

Synonyms
- Mantis (Rhombodera) valida (Burmeister, 1838); Hierodula (Rhombodera) rotunda (Giglio-Tos, 1917); Hierodula (Rhombodera) valida

= Rhombodera valida =

Species of praying mantis

Rhombodera valida is a species of praying mantises in the family Mantidae, found in Indomalaya.

== Etymology ==
In Latin "valida" means strong, powerful or valid. Rhomboid shape. In Greek dera means neck.

== Description ==
Rhombodera valida has a broader, sub-circular, rhomboidal pronotum than Rhombodera basalis.

== See also ==
- List of mantis genera and species
- Mantises of Asia
- Leaf mantis
- Shield mantis
