= Tricharia vainioi =

Scientific classification
- Domain: Eukaryota
- Kingdom: Fungi
- Division: Ascomycota
- Class: Lecanoromycetes
- Order: Graphidales
- Family: Gomphillaceae
- Genus: Tricharia
- Species: T. vainioi

Binomial name
- Tricharia vainioi R.Sant. (1952)

Species of lichen

Tricharia vainioi is a species of foliicolous lichen in the family Gomphillaceae. It is widely distributed, having been recorded in Africa, Asia, Australia, Central and South America.

== Taxonomy ==
The lichen was first formally described by Swedish lichenologist Rolf Santesson in 1952. The specific epithet honours Finnish lichenologist Edvard Vainio.

== Description ==
Tricharia vainioi has sessile, dark brown apothecia that are either slightly constricted at the base or not at all. Its ascospores measure 32–54 by 15–28 μm.

== Habitat and distribution ==
In Asia, the lichen has been recorded from Taiwan, in Nantou County and Pingtung County. In these locations, the lichen was growing on either Alpinia speciosa, Asplenium nidus, or Diospyros. In China, it has been found at the Tropical Botanical Garden in Mengla County. In Venezuela, it has been collected in a montane forest at an altitude of 1,700 m (5,600 ft). In 2002, it was reported from the first time from Kenya, in Kwale County. Tricharia vainioi is also found in Australia.

In Costa Rica, Tricharia vainioi was one of 23 species of lichens found growing mainly on the pronotum, but also on the forewings of the shield mantis species Choeradodis rhombicollis and Choeradodis rhomboidea. The degree of lichen colonisation is more pronounced in females, who have a longer lifespan (2 years versus 1 year in males).
