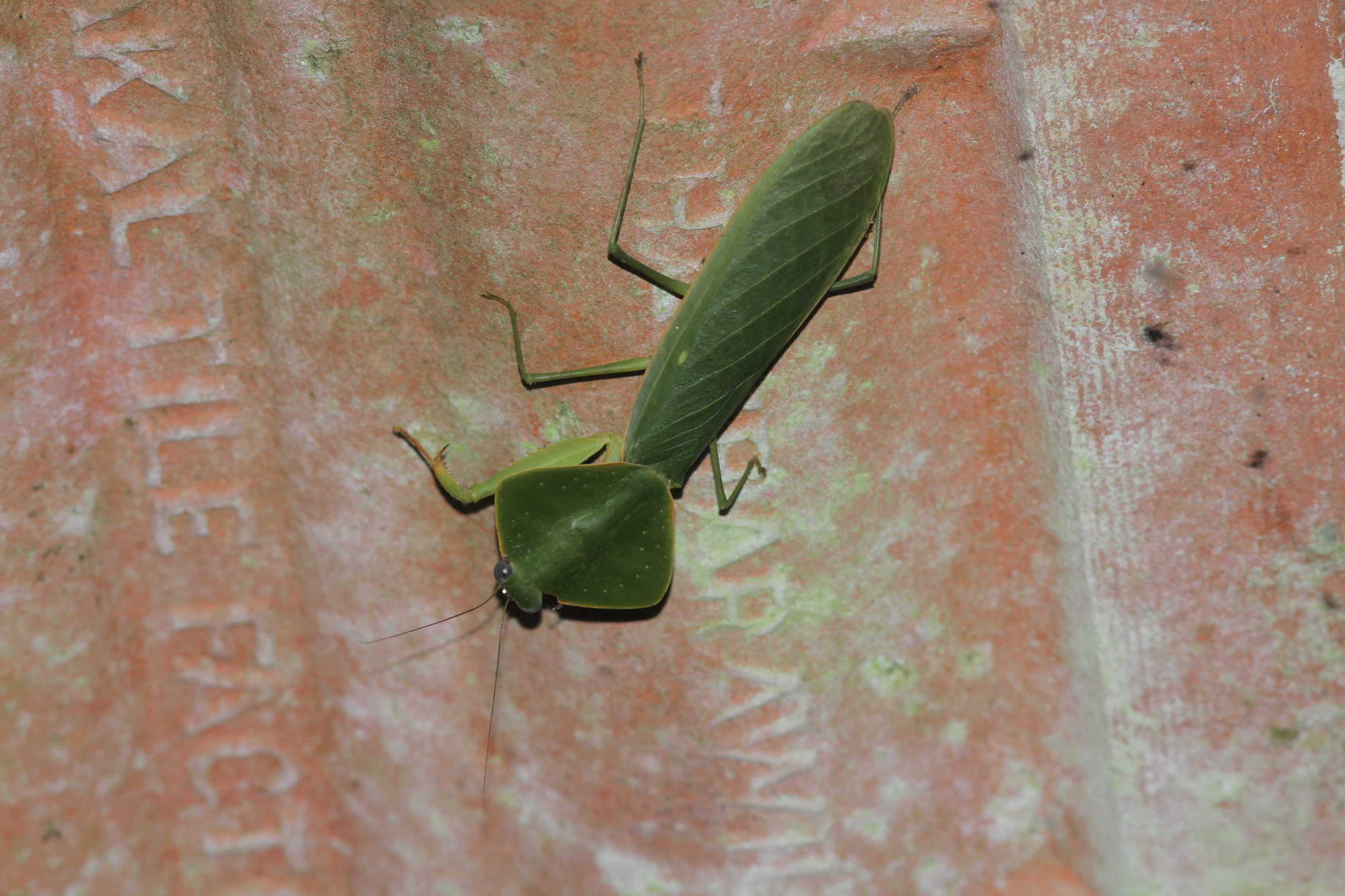
- Asiadodis squilla

Scientific classification
- Kingdom: Animalia
- Phylum: Arthropoda
- Clade: Pancrustacea
- Class: Insecta
- Order: Mantodea
- Family: Mantidae
- Subfamily: Choeradodinae
- Genus: Asiadodis; Roy, 2004

Species
- see text

= Asiadodis =

Genus of praying mantises

Asiadodis is a genus of praying mantises native to Asia and possessing common names such as shield mantis, hood mantis (or hooded mantis), and leaf mantis (or leafy mantis) because of their extended, leaf-like thoraxes. They were formerly included in Choeradodis, a similar genus of mantis from the Americas.

The following species are recognised in the genus Asiadodis:

- Asiadodis squilla (Asian shield mantis)
- Asiadodis yunnanensis (Chinese shield mantis)

== See also ==
- List of mantis genera and species
- Leaf mantis
- Shield mantis
