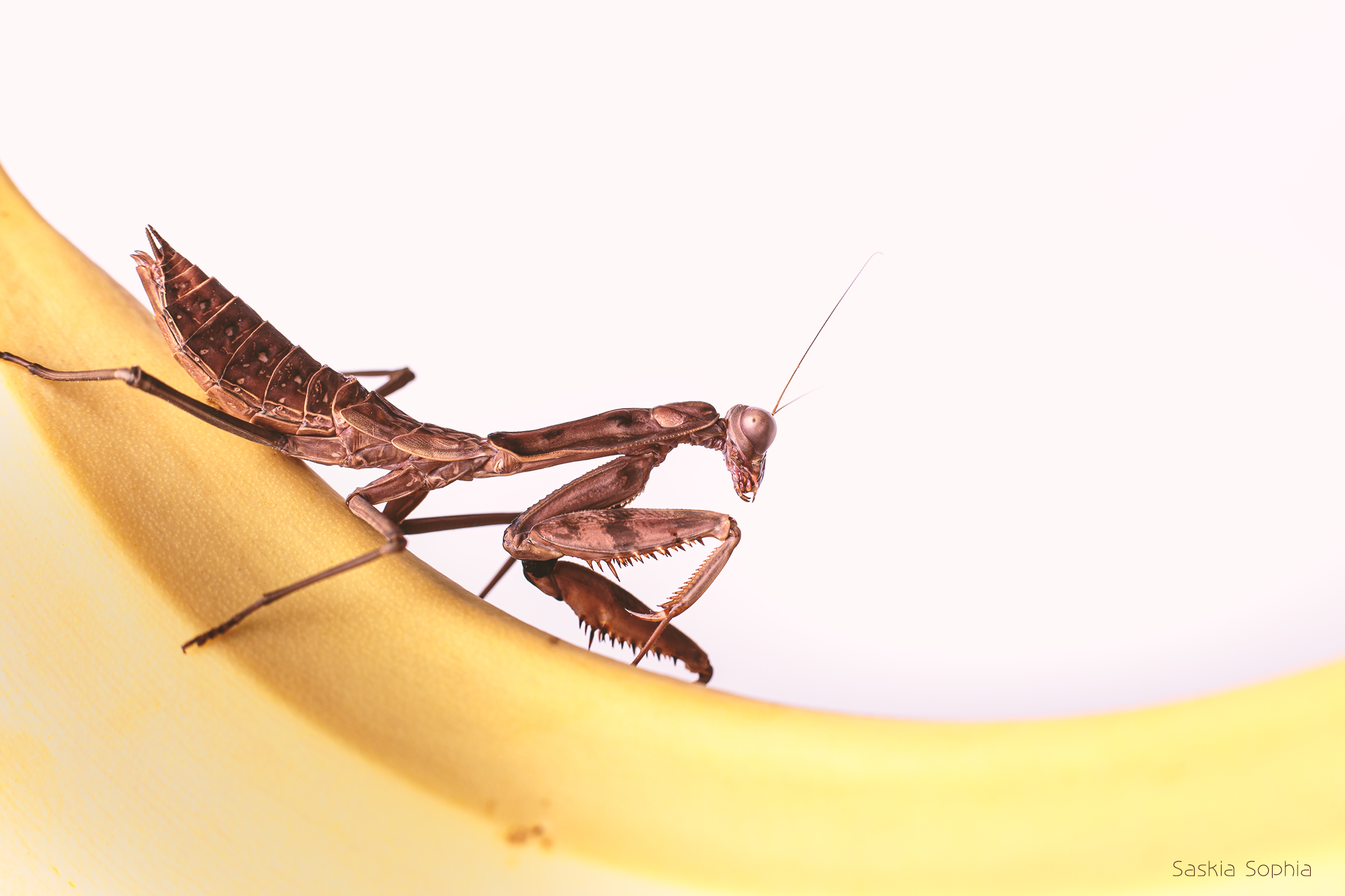
- Tamolanica tamolana

Scientific classification
- Kingdom: Animalia
- Phylum: Arthropoda
- Clade: Pancrustacea
- Class: Insecta
- Order: Mantodea
- Family: Mantidae
- Tribe: Hierodulini
- Genus: Tamolanica; Werner, 1923

Species
- see text

= Tamolanica =

Genus of praying mantises

Tamolanica is a genus of praying mantises native to Asia. They have common names such as shield mantis, hood mantis (or hooded mantis), and leaf mantis (or leafy mantis) because of their extended, leaf-like thoraxes. The following species are recognised in the genus Tamolanica:

- Tamolanica andaina
- Tamolanica atricoxis (Hooded Horror)
- Tamolanica decipiens
- Tamolanica denticulata
- Tamolanica dilena
- Tamolanica katauana
- Tamolanica leopoldi
- Tamolanica pectoralis
- Tamolanica phryne
- Tamolanica tamolana (New Guinea shield mantis)

== See also ==
- List of mantis genera and species
- Leaf mantis
- Shield mantis
