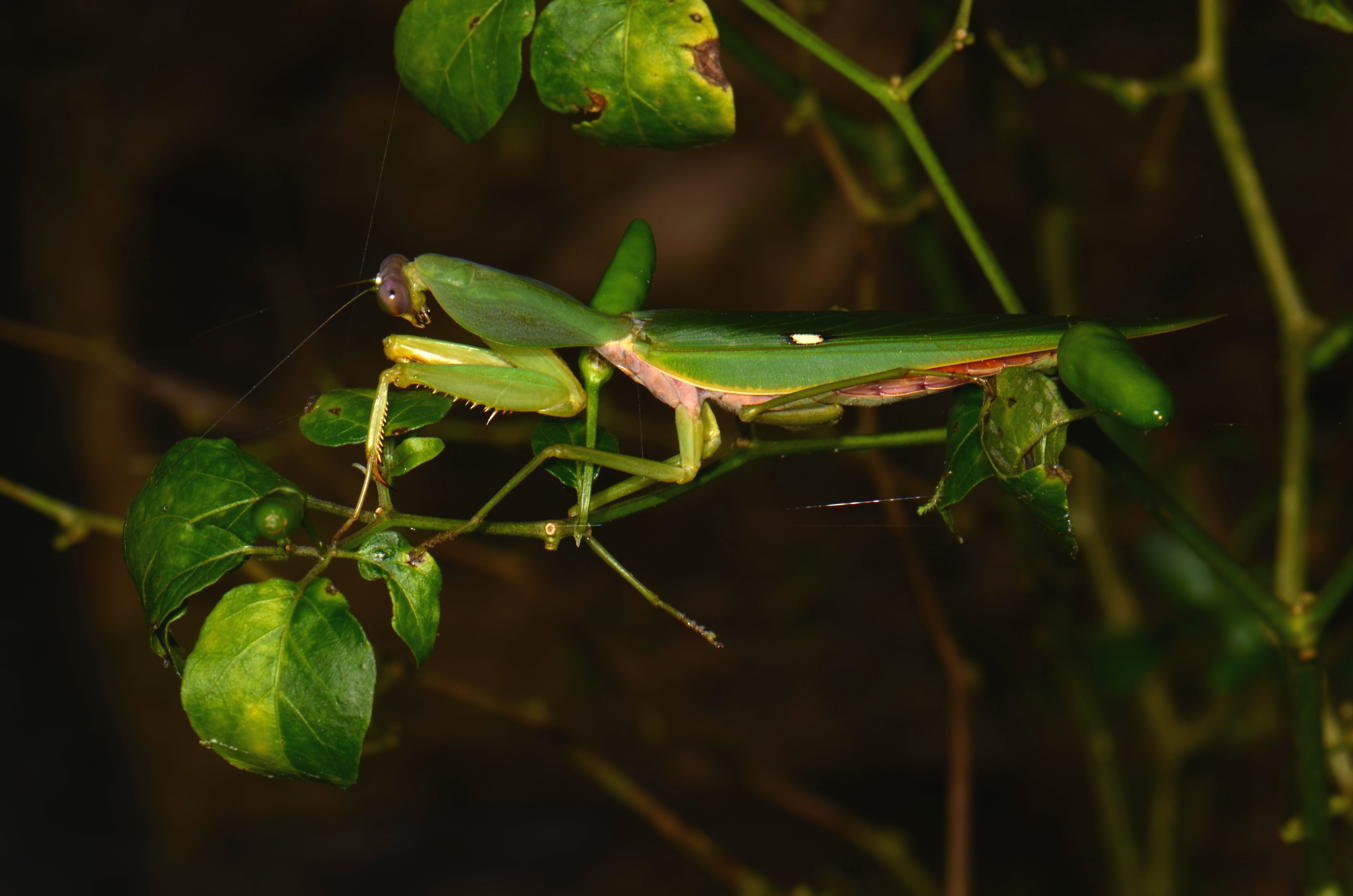
- male Rhombodera sp.

Scientific classification
- Kingdom: Animalia
- Phylum: Arthropoda
- Clade: Pancrustacea
- Class: Insecta
- Order: Mantodea
- Family: Mantidae
- Subfamily: Hierodulinae
- Tribe: Hierodulini
- Genus: Rhombodera; Burmeister, 1838

= Rhombodera =

Genus of praying mantises

Rhombodera is a genus of praying mantises native to Asia and possessing common names such as shield mantis, hood mantis (or hooded mantis), and leaf mantis (or leafy mantis) because of their extended, leaf-like prothorax.

== Species ==
These 29 species belong to the genus Rhombodera:

- Rhombodera basalis de Haan, 1842 (Giant Malaysian Shield Mantis)
- Rhombodera boschmai Deeleman-Reinhold, 1957
- Rhombodera brachynota Wang & Dong, 1993
- Rhombodera crassa Giglio-Tos, 1912
- Rhombodera doriana Laidlaw, 1931
- Rhombodera extensicollis Serville, 1839 (Diamond Shield Mantis)
- Rhombodera extraordinaria Beier, 1942
- Rhombodera fratricida Wood-Mason, 1878
- Rhombodera handschini Werner, 1933
- Rhombodera javana Giglio-Tos, 1912
- Rhombodera keiana Giglio-Tos, 1912
- Rhombodera kirbyi Beier, 1952 (Timor Shield Mantis)
- Rhombodera laticollis Burmeister, 1838
- Rhombodera latipronotum Zhang
- Rhombodera lingulata Stal, 1877
- Rhombodera megaera Rehn, 1904 (Thai Giant Mantis)
- Rhombodera mjobergi Werner, 1930
- Rhombodera morokana Giglio-Tos, 1912
- Rhombodera ornatipes Werner, 1922
- Rhombodera palawanensis Beier, 1966
- Rhombodera papuana Werner, 1929
- Rhombodera rennellana Beier, 1968
- Rhombodera rollei Beier, 1935
- Rhombodera sjostedti Werner, 1930
- Rhombodera stalii Giglio-Tos, 1912 (Giant Shield Mantis)
- Rhombodera taprobanae Wood-Mason, 1878
- Rhombodera titania Stal, 1877
- Rhombodera valida Burmeister, 1838
- Rhombodera zhangi Wang & Dong, 1993

== See also ==
- List of mantis genera and species
- Mantises of Asia
- Leaf mantis
- Shield mantis
