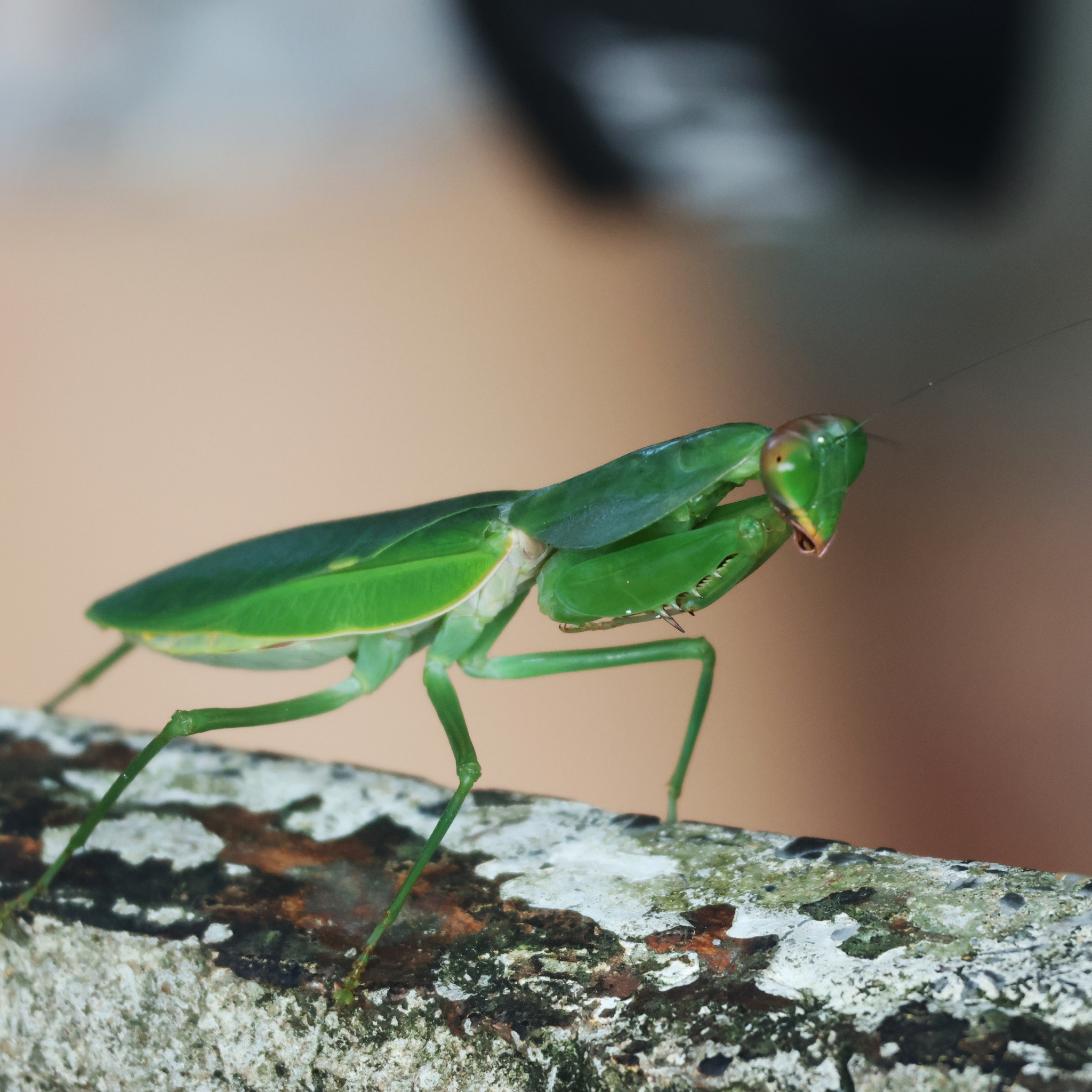

Scientific classification
- Kingdom: Animalia
- Phylum: Arthropoda
- Clade: Pancrustacea
- Class: Insecta
- Order: Mantodea
- Family: Mantidae
- Subfamily: Hierodulinae
- Tribe: Hierodulini
- Genus: Rhombodera
- Species: R. latipronotum

Binomial name
- Rhombodera latipronotum Zhang

= Rhombodera latipronotum =

Species of praying mantis

Rhombodera latipronotum is a species of praying mantis in the family Mantidae, found in China. New findings confirm its presence in the Guangxi region and the Indo-Chinese states of Laos and Vietnam.

== See also ==
- List of mantis genera and species
