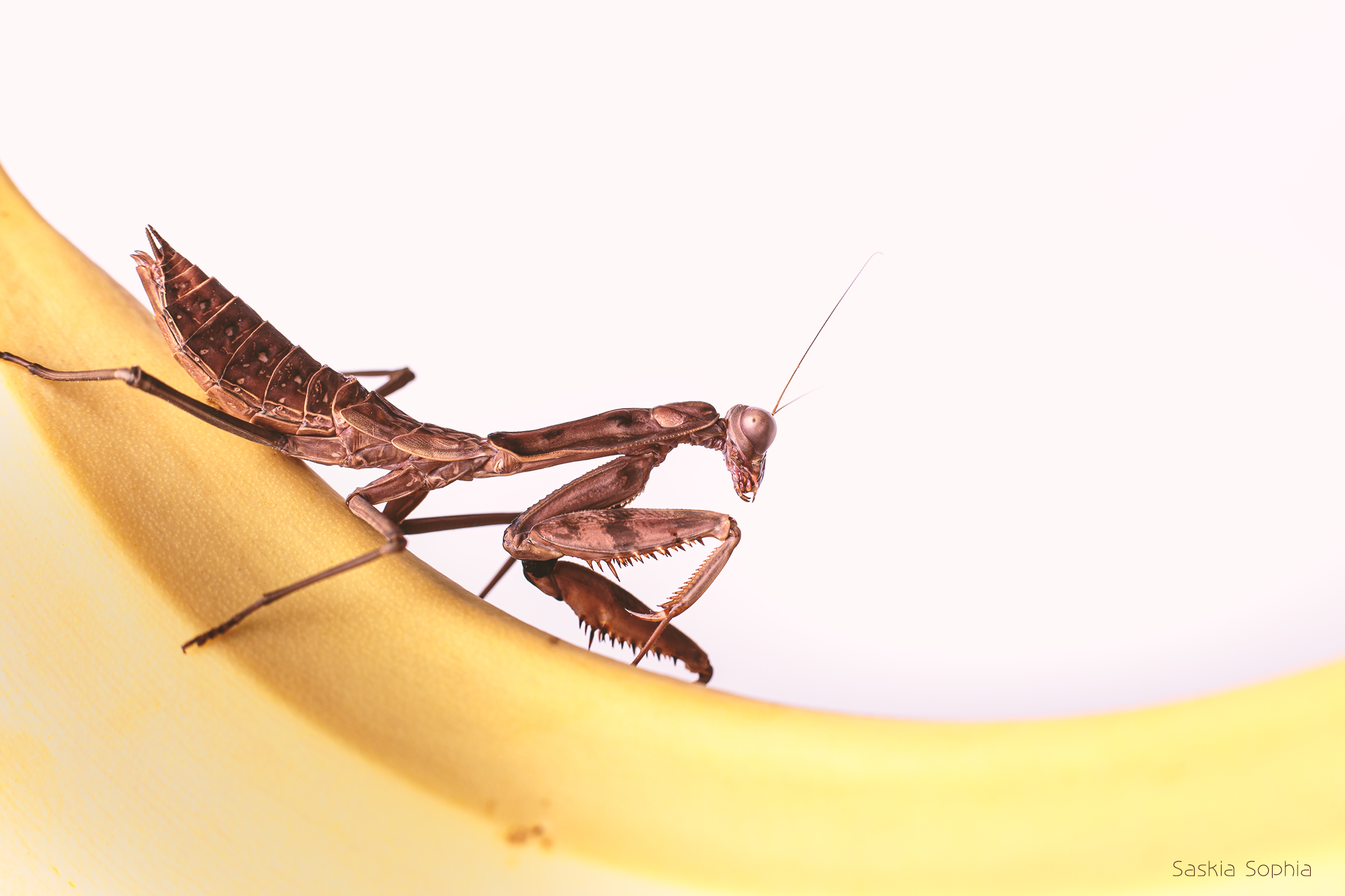

Scientific classification
- Kingdom: Animalia
- Phylum: Arthropoda
- Clade: Pancrustacea
- Class: Insecta
- Order: Mantodea
- Family: Mantidae
- Genus: Tamolanica
- Species: T. tamolana

Binomial name
- Tamolanica tamolana Werner, 1923

= Tamolanica tamolana =

Species of praying mantis

Tamolanica tamolana, common name New Guinea shield mantis, is a species of praying mantis native to New Guinea.

== See also ==
- List of mantis genera and species
