= Rhombodera kirbyi =

Scientific classification
- Kingdom: Animalia
- Phylum: Arthropoda
- Clade: Pancrustacea
- Class: Insecta
- Order: Mantodea
- Family: Mantidae
- Subfamily: Hierodulinae
- Tribe: Hierodulini
- Genus: Rhombodera
- Species: R. kirbyi

Binomial name
- Rhombodera kirbyi Beier, 1952

Synonyms
- Rhombodera saussurii Kirby, 1904

Species of praying mantis

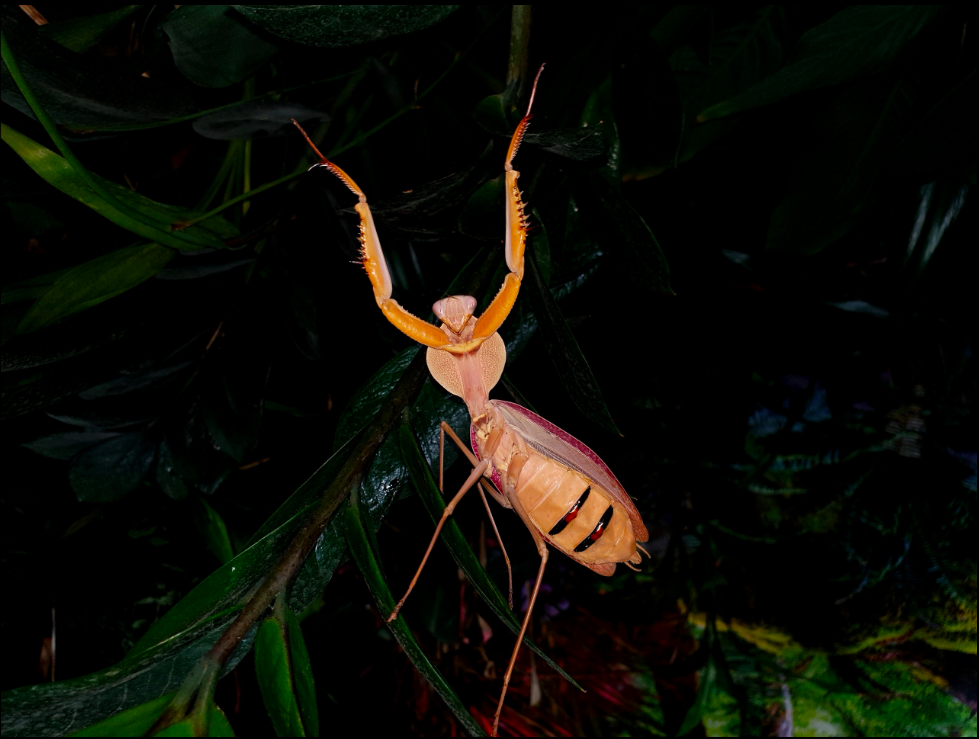
A female Rhombodera kirbyi in a threatening pose

Rhombodera kirbyi is a species of praying mantises in the family Mantidae, found in Timor, giving it its common name of the Timor Shield Mantis.

The kirbyi is a large species of mantis with the female reaching up to 10 cm with the male slightly smaller at 8-8.5 cm. It is found in different morphs ranging from a very pale green to a dark brown colour. The kirbyi is also sometimes kept as a pet due to low requirements.

== See also ==
- List of mantis genera and species
