= Rhombodera zhangi =

Scientific classification
- Kingdom: Animalia
- Phylum: Arthropoda
- Clade: Pancrustacea
- Class: Insecta
- Order: Mantodea
- Family: Mantidae
- Subfamily: Hierodulinae
- Tribe: Hierodulini
- Genus: Rhombodera
- Species: R. zhangi

Binomial name
- Rhombodera zhangi Wang & Dong, 1993

Species of praying mantis

Rhombodera zhangi is a species of praying mantises in the family Mantidae, found in China.

== See also ==
- List of mantis genera and species
