= Rhombodera sjostedti =

Scientific classification
- Kingdom: Animalia
- Phylum: Arthropoda
- Clade: Pancrustacea
- Class: Insecta
- Order: Mantodea
- Family: Mantidae
- Subfamily: Hierodulinae
- Tribe: Hierodulini
- Genus: Rhombodera
- Species: R. sjostedti

Binomial name
- Rhombodera sjostedti Werner, 1930

Species of praying mantis

Rhombodera sjostedti is a species of praying mantis in the family Mantidae, found on the Tenimbar Islands of Indonesia.

== See also ==
- List of mantis genera and species
