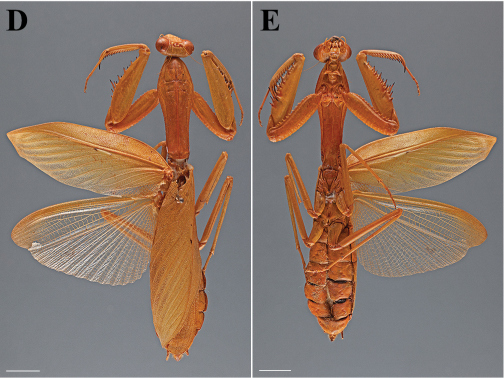

Scientific classification
- Kingdom: Animalia
- Phylum: Arthropoda
- Clade: Pancrustacea
- Class: Insecta
- Order: Mantodea
- Family: Mantidae
- Subfamily: Hierodulinae
- Tribe: Hierodulini
- Genus: Rhombodera
- Species: R. megaera

Binomial name
- Rhombodera megaera Rehn, 1904

= Rhombodera megaera =

Species of praying mantis

Rhombodera megaera is a species of praying mantises in the family Mantidae, found in China and Thailand.

== Description ==
R. megaera is one of the largest species in the genus Rhombodera. The underside of the thorax is red.

== See also ==
- List of mantis genera and species
