= Rhombodera extensicollis =

Scientific classification
- Kingdom: Animalia
- Phylum: Arthropoda
- Clade: Pancrustacea
- Class: Insecta
- Order: Mantodea
- Family: Mantidae
- Subfamily: Hierodulinae
- Tribe: Hierodulini
- Genus: Rhombodera
- Species: R. extensicollis

Binomial name
- Rhombodera extensicollis Serville, 1839

Synonyms
- Rhombodera macropsis Giebel, 1861; Rhombodera rhomboidalis Saussure, 1870

Species of praying mantis

Rhombodera extensicollis is a species of praying mantises in the family Mantidae, found in Indomalaya.

== See also ==
- List of mantis genera and species
