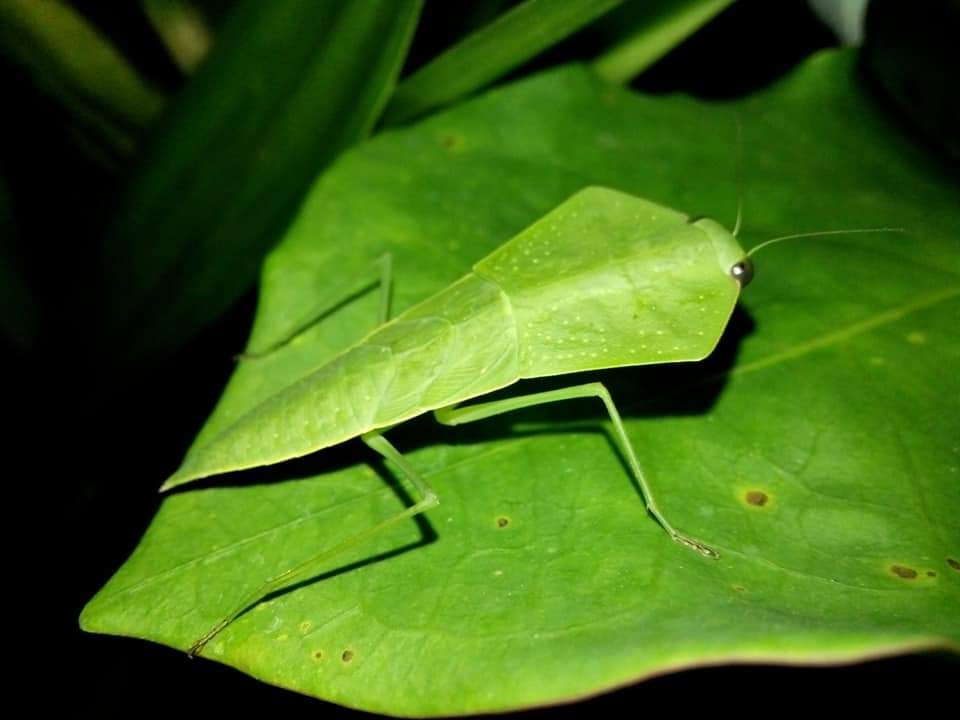

Scientific classification
- Kingdom: Animalia
- Phylum: Arthropoda
- Clade: Pancrustacea
- Class: Insecta
- Order: Mantodea
- Family: Mantidae
- Genus: Asiadodis
- Species: A. yunnanensis

Binomial name
- Asiadodis yunnanensis (Wang & Liang, 1995)

= Asiadodis yunnanensis =

Species of praying mantis

Asiadodis yunnanensis is a species of praying mantis in the family Mantidae. It is found in China, Myanmar, and Thailand.

== See also ==
- List of mantis genera and species
