= Rhombodera stalii =

Scientific classification
- Kingdom: Animalia
- Phylum: Arthropoda
- Clade: Pancrustacea
- Class: Insecta
- Order: Mantodea
- Family: Mantidae
- Subfamily: Hierodulinae
- Tribe: Hierodulini
- Genus: Rhombodera
- Species: R. stalii

Binomial name
- Rhombodera stalii Giglio-Tos, 1912

Species of praying mantis

Rhombodera stalii is a species of praying mantis in the family Mantidae, found on the island of Java in Indonesia.

== See also ==
- List of mantis genera and species
