= Rhombodera mjobergi =

Scientific classification
- Kingdom: Animalia
- Phylum: Arthropoda
- Clade: Pancrustacea
- Class: Insecta
- Order: Mantodea
- Family: Mantidae
- Subfamily: Hierodulinae
- Tribe: Hierodulini
- Genus: Rhombodera
- Species: R. mjobergi

Binomial name
- Rhombodera mjobergi Werner, 1930

Species of praying mantis

Rhombodera mjobergi is a species of praying mantis of the family Mantidae. It is native to Asia.

== See also ==
- List of mantis genera and species
