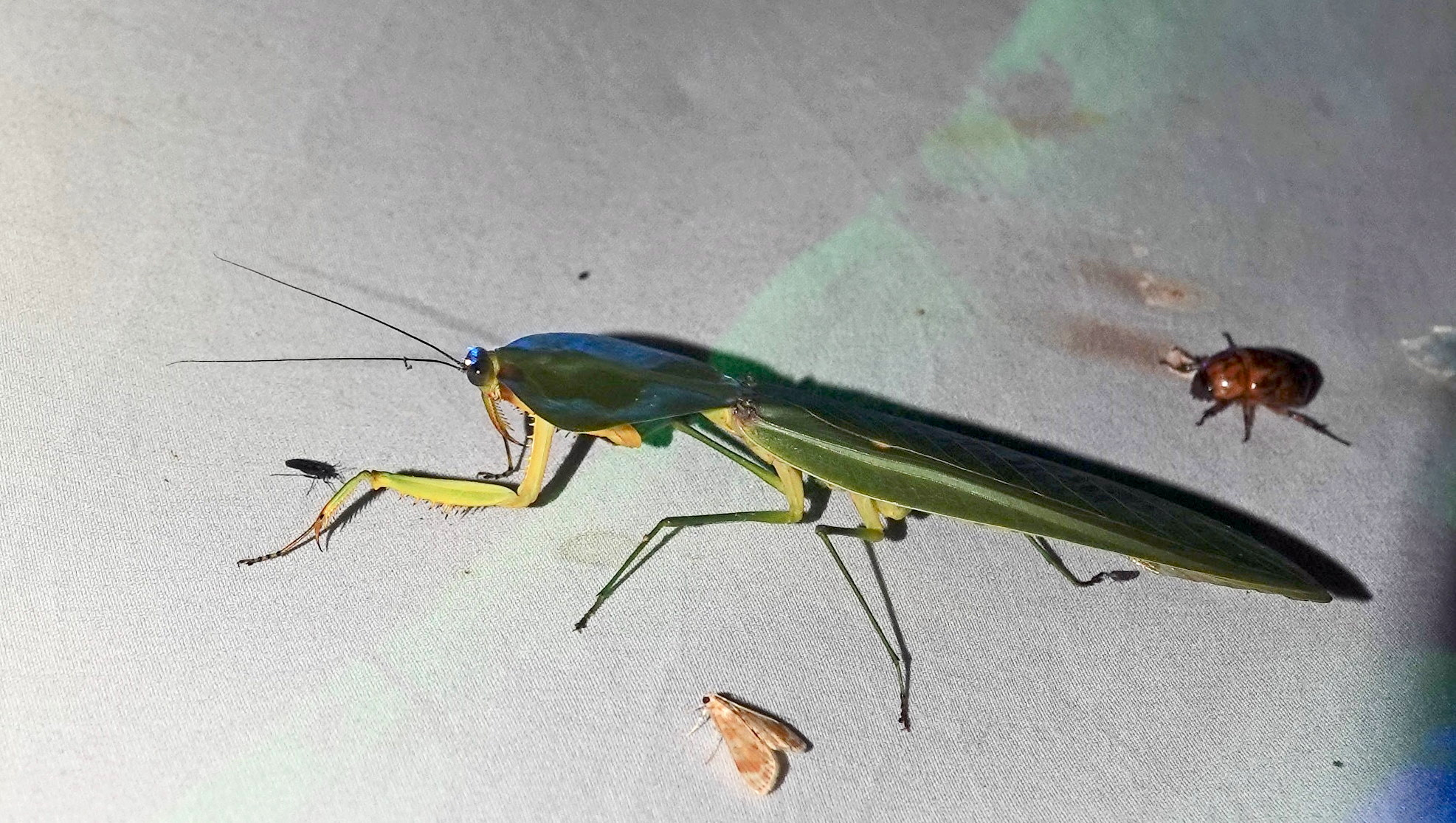

Scientific classification
- Kingdom: Animalia
- Phylum: Arthropoda
- Clade: Pancrustacea
- Class: Insecta
- Order: Mantodea
- Family: Mantidae
- Genus: Choeradodis
- Species: C. columbica

Binomial name
- Choeradodis columbica Stoll 1813

= Choeradodis columbica =

Species of praying mantis

Choeradodis columbica, or Colombian shield mantis, is a species of praying mantis native to Colombia and Peru.

== See also ==
- List of mantis genera and species
