= Rhombodera papuana =

Scientific classification
- Kingdom: Animalia
- Phylum: Arthropoda
- Clade: Pancrustacea
- Class: Insecta
- Order: Mantodea
- Family: Mantidae
- Subfamily: Hierodulinae
- Tribe: Hierodulini
- Genus: Rhombodera
- Species: R. papuana

Binomial name
- Rhombodera papuana Werner, 1929

Species of praying mantis

Rhombodera papuana is a species of praying mantises in the family Mantidae. It is found on the island of New Guinea.

== See also ==
- List of mantis genera and species
- Mantises of Asia
- Mantises of Oceania
