= Rhombodera titania =

Scientific classification
- Kingdom: Animalia
- Phylum: Arthropoda
- Clade: Pancrustacea
- Class: Insecta
- Order: Mantodea
- Family: Mantidae
- Subfamily: Hierodulinae
- Tribe: Hierodulini
- Genus: Rhombodera
- Species: R. titania

Binomial name
- Rhombodera titania Stal, 1877

Synonyms
- Rhombodera dubia Giglio-Tos, 1927

Species of praying mantis

Rhombodera titania is a species of praying mantises in the family Mantidae, found in Indomalaya.

== See also ==
- List of mantis genera and species
