= Rhombodera javana =

Scientific classification
- Kingdom: Animalia
- Phylum: Arthropoda
- Clade: Pancrustacea
- Class: Insecta
- Order: Mantodea
- Family: Mantidae
- Subfamily: Hierodulinae
- Tribe: Hierodulini
- Genus: Rhombodera
- Species: R. javana

Binomial name
- Rhombodera javana Giglio-Tos, 1912

Synonyms
- Rhombodera javanica Werner, 1923

Species of praying mantis

Rhombodera javana is a species of praying mantises in the family Mantidae, found in China and the island of Java in Indonesia.

== See also ==
- List of mantis genera and species
- Mantises of Asia
