= Tamolanica phryne =

Scientific classification
- Domain: Eukaryota
- Kingdom: Animalia
- Phylum: Arthropoda
- Class: Insecta
- Order: Mantodea
- Family: Mantidae
- Genus: Tamolanica
- Species: T. phryne

Binomial name
- Tamolanica phryne Stal, 1877

Synonyms
- Hierodula immaculifemorata (Werner, 1922)

Species of praying mantis

Tamolanica phryne is a species of praying mantis in the family Mantidae.
