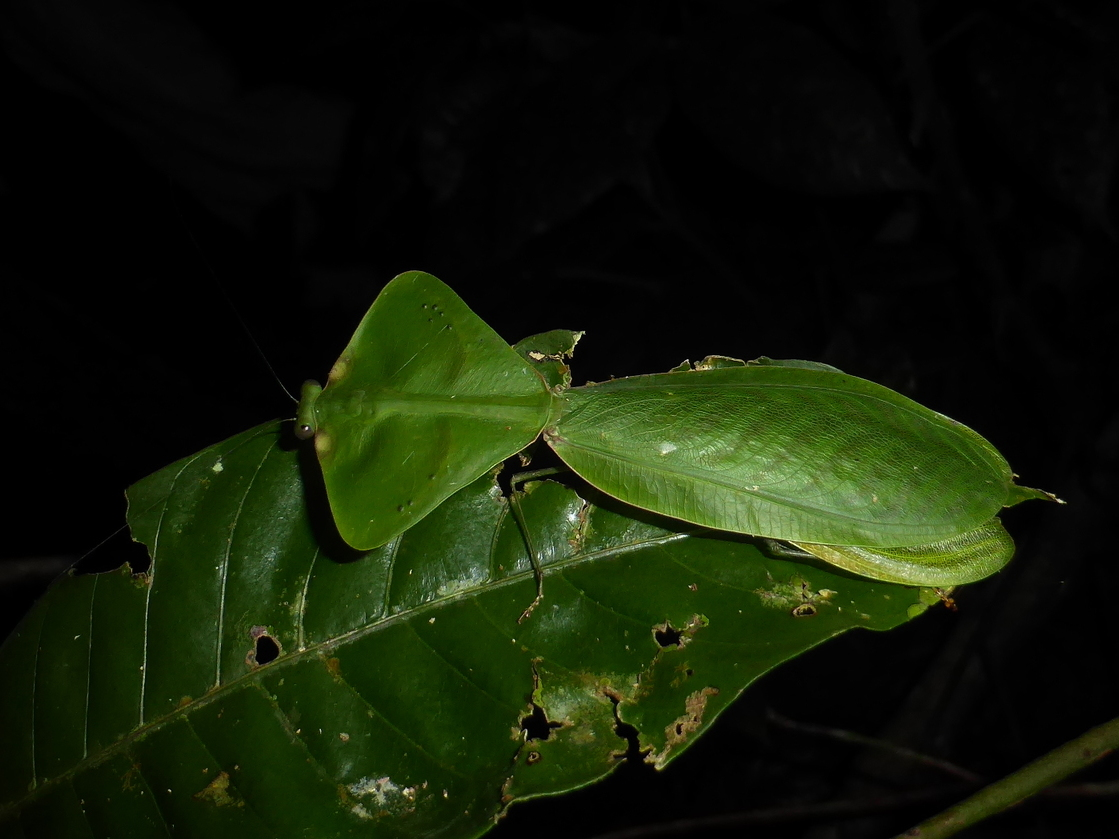
- Male in French Guiana

Scientific classification
- Kingdom: Animalia
- Phylum: Arthropoda
- Clade: Pancrustacea
- Class: Insecta
- Order: Mantodea
- Family: Mantidae
- Genus: Choeradodis
- Species: C. strumaria

Binomial name
- Choeradodis strumaria (Linnaeus, 1758)

Synonyms
- Gryllus strumarius Linnaeus, 1758; Choeradodis cancellata Fabricius, 1775

= Choeradodis strumaria =

Species of praying mantis

Choeradodis strumaria, common names leaf mantis and hooded mantis, is a species of praying mantis native to French Guiana and Suriname; although there have been reports from other, distant countries, these are considered erroneous.

== Description ==
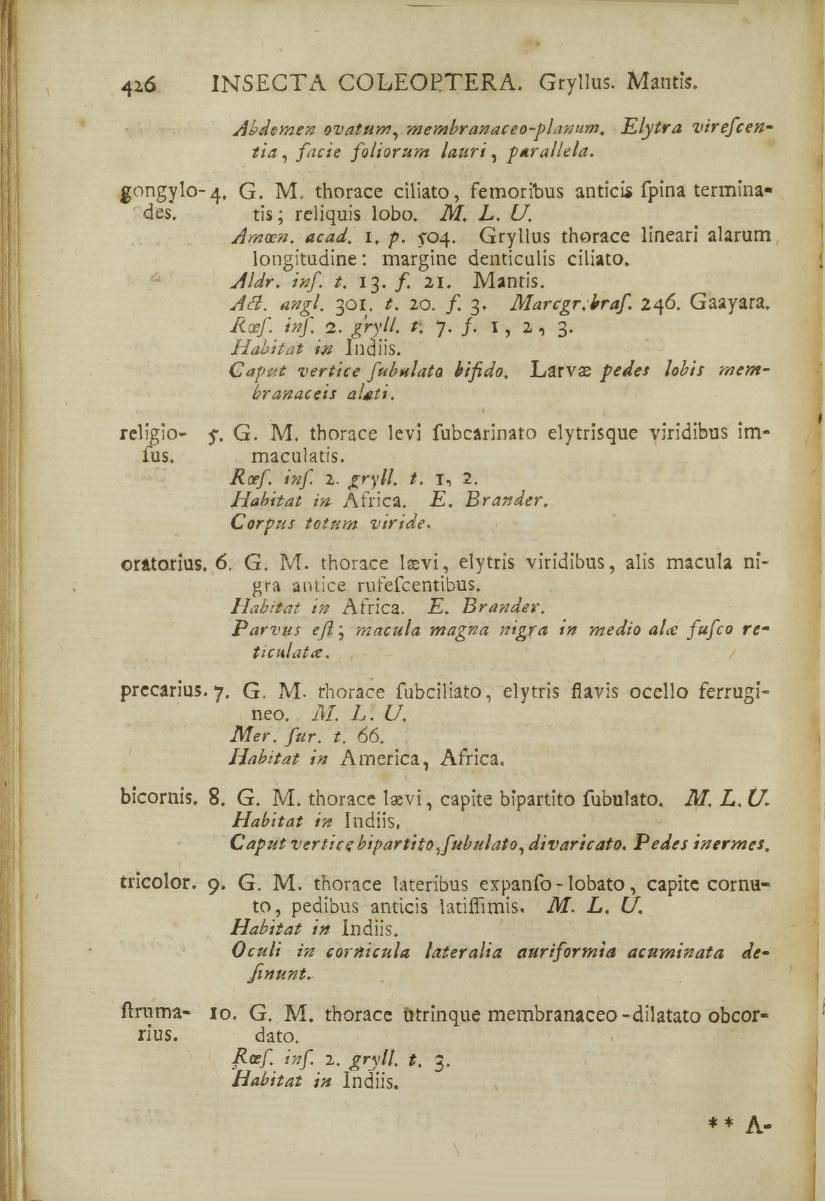
Copy of the original description of several species of mantis including Choeradodis strumaria, described by Carl Linnaeus as Gryllus (Mantis) strumarius in 1758.

The hooded mantis is also called the leaf mantis or leaf-mimic mantis because it mimics leaves. Like most other mantids, it is an ambush predator. C. strumaria is a chlorophyll-green colour and has a uniquely shaped hood; its wings have leaf-like veins that add to its perfect camouflage. It also has colorful patterns on the underside of its prothorax.

== See also ==
- List of mantis genera and species
