= Rhombodera lingulata =

Scientific classification
- Kingdom: Animalia
- Phylum: Arthropoda
- Clade: Pancrustacea
- Class: Insecta
- Order: Mantodea
- Family: Mantidae
- Subfamily: Hierodulinae
- Tribe: Hierodulini
- Genus: Rhombodera
- Species: R. lingulata

Binomial name
- Rhombodera lingulata Stal, 1877

Synonyms
- Rhombodera flava de Haan, 1842

Species of praying mantis

Rhombodera lingulata is a species of praying mantises in the family Mantidae, found in Asia.
