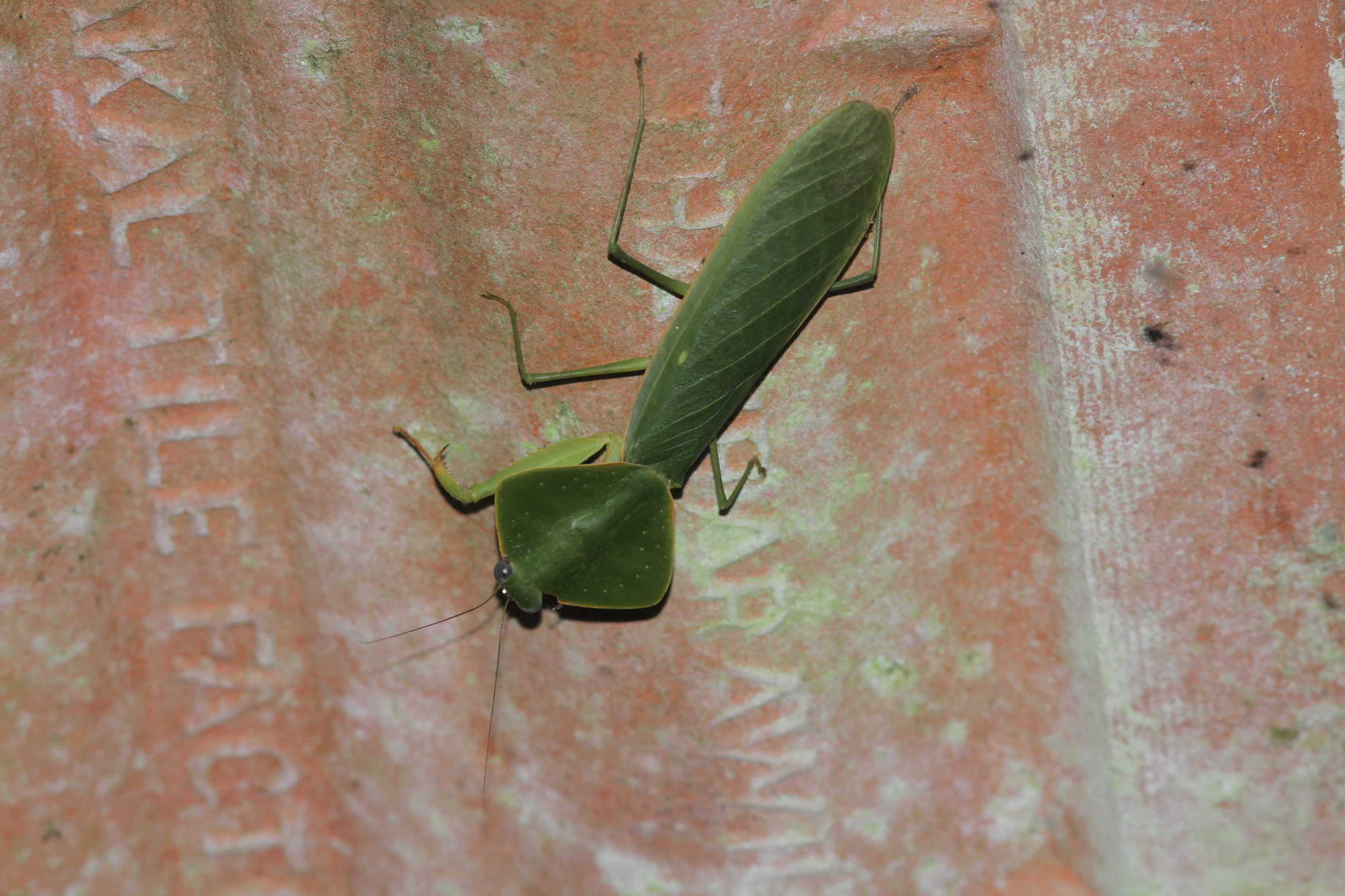

Scientific classification
- Kingdom: Animalia
- Phylum: Arthropoda
- Clade: Pancrustacea
- Class: Insecta
- Order: Mantodea
- Family: Mantidae
- Genus: Asiadodis
- Species: A. squilla

Binomial name
- Asiadodis squilla (Saussure, 1869)

Synonyms
- Choeradodis squilla Saussure, 1869

= Asiadodis squilla =

Species of praying mantis

Asiadodis squilla is a species of praying mantis in the family Mantidae. It is native to India and Sri Lanka, and it is the type species for the genus Asiadodis.

== See also ==
- List of mantis genera and species
