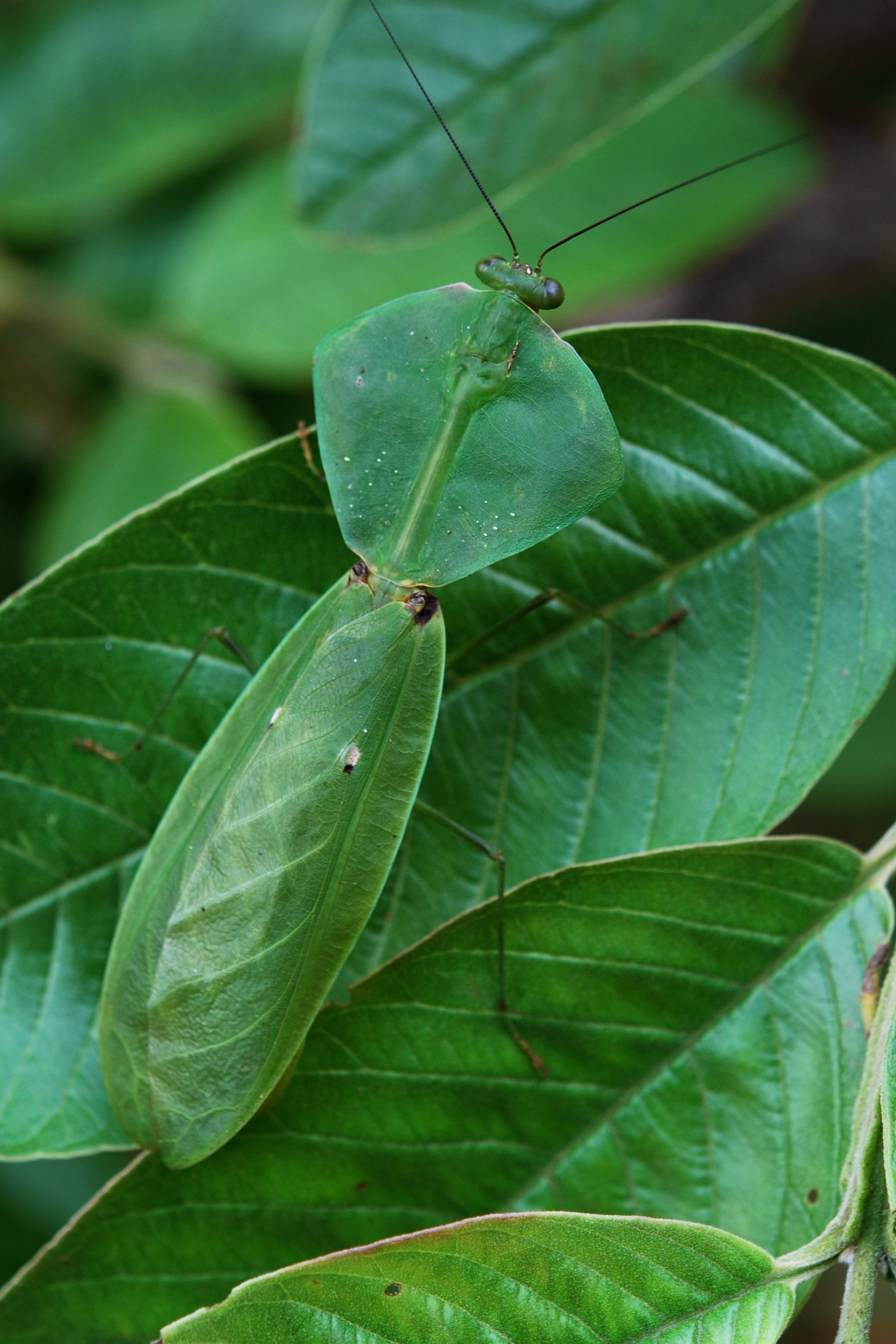

Scientific classification
- Kingdom: Animalia
- Phylum: Arthropoda
- Clade: Pancrustacea
- Class: Insecta
- Order: Mantodea
- Family: Mantidae
- Subfamily: Choeradodinae
- Genus: Choeradodis; Serville, 1831

Species
- several; see text

Synonyms
- Craurusa Burmeister, 1838

= Choeradodis =

Genus of praying mantises

Choeradodis is a genus of praying mantises with common names such as shield mantis, hood mantis (or hooded mantis), and leaf mantis (or leafy mantis) because of their extended, leaf-like thoraces. The distinguishing characteristic of Choreododis from which it takes its common names is a laterally expanded thorax. This adaptation for the purpose of camouflage, as well as a rounded wing case and a habit of staying relatively flattened, aid its leaf mimicry. Tiny liverworts, lichens and fungi have been found growing on the pronotum and wing case of many Choeradodis mantids; these appear to be opportunistic growths rather than an example of coevolution with the mantids to afford extra camouflage.

== Distribution ==
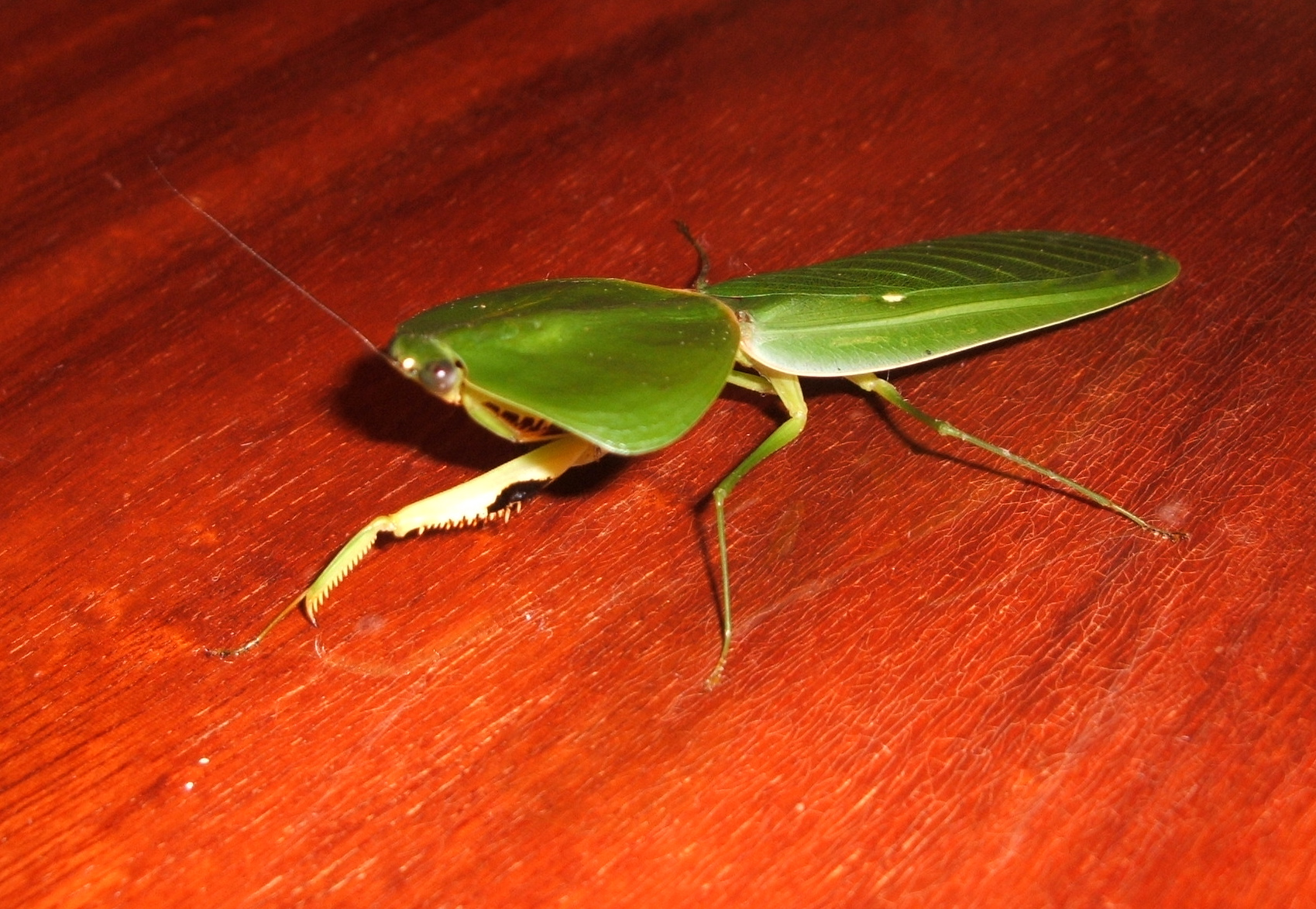
Choeradodis rhombicollis in Costa Rica

Choeradodis is endemic to the Neotropical realm, ranging from tropical South America, through Central America, to Mexico. The similar Asian shield mantis that formerly were included in Choeradodis have been moved to their own genus Asiadodis.

== Species ==
The following species are recognised in the genus Choeradodis:

- Choeradodis columbica (Colombian shield mantis)
- Choeradodis rhombicollis (Peruvian shield mantis)
- Choeradodis rhomboidea (tropical shield mantis, hooded mantis, leaf mantis
- Choeradodis stalii (tropical shield mantis, hooded mantis, leaf mantis)
- Choeradodis strumaria (leaf mantis, hooded mantis)

== See also ==
- List of mantis genera and species
- Leaf mantis
- Shield mantis
