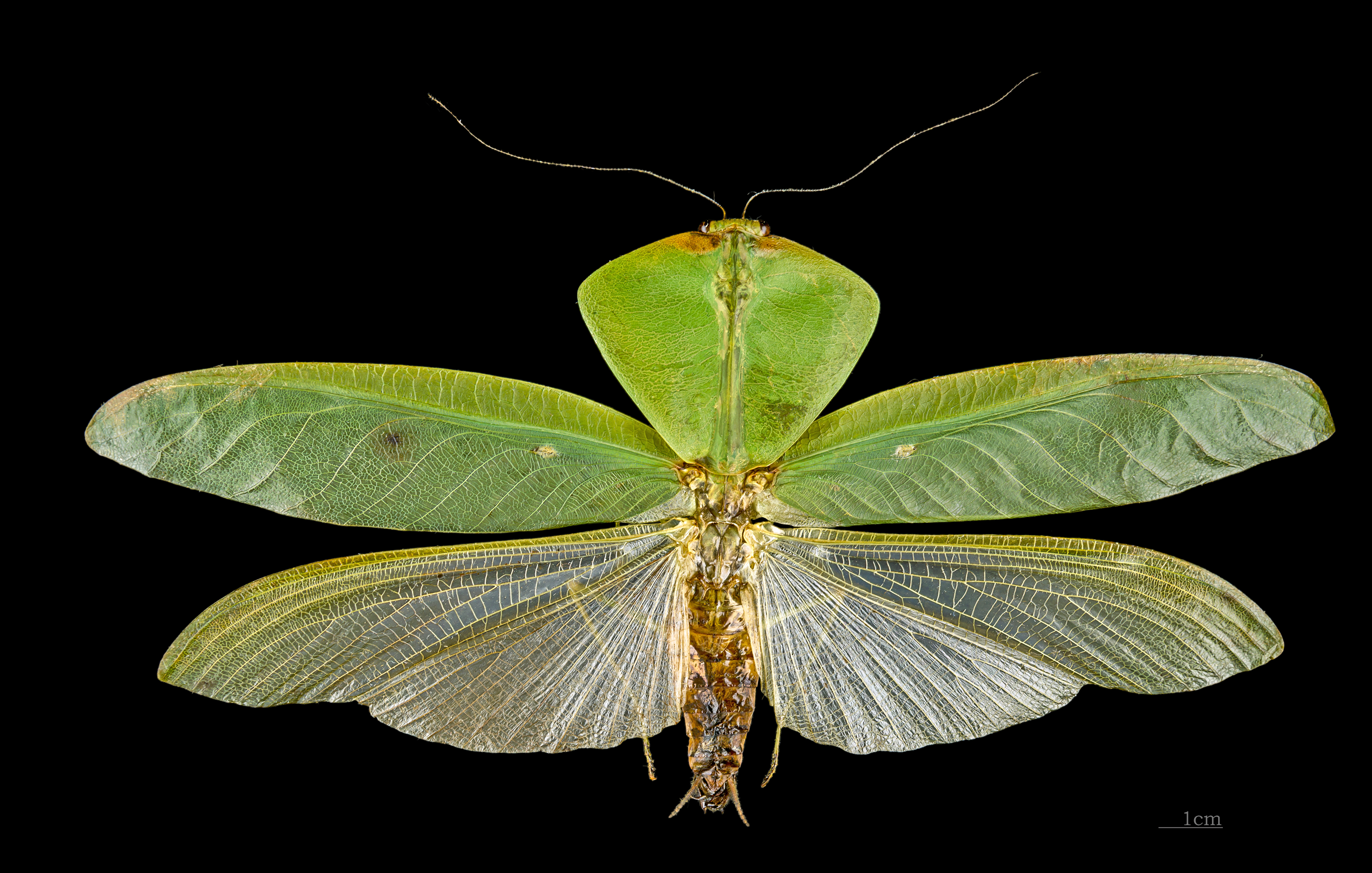
- Choeradodis stalii - MHNT
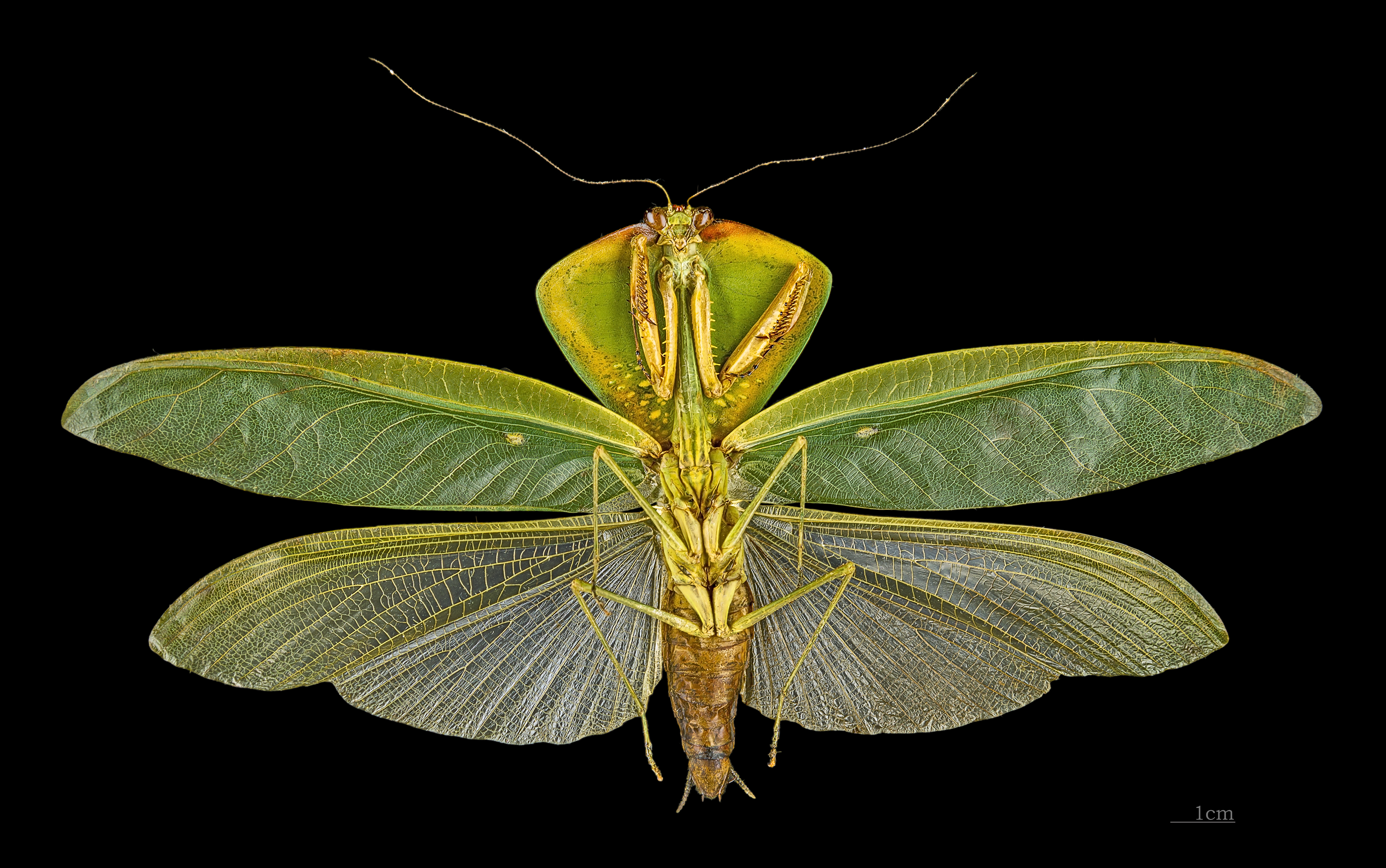
- Choeradodis stalii △ - MHNT

Scientific classification
- Kingdom: Animalia
- Phylum: Arthropoda
- Clade: Pancrustacea
- Class: Insecta
- Order: Mantodea
- Family: Mantidae
- Genus: Choeradodis
- Species: C. stalii

Binomial name
- Choeradodis stalii Wood-Mason, 1880

= Choeradodis stalii =

Species of praying mantis

Choeradodis stalii is a species of praying mantis with common names that include tropical shield mantis, hooded mantis, and leaf mantis. It is found in Brazil, Ecuador, French Guiana, Panama, and Peru.

Nymphs of this species are born with a bright red color distinguishing them from other Choeradodis spp. Even at early instars, they display somewhat of a hood. Each time the larvae moult, they grow more greenish and their hood grows larger, until they reach adulthood.

== See also ==
- List of mantis genera and species
