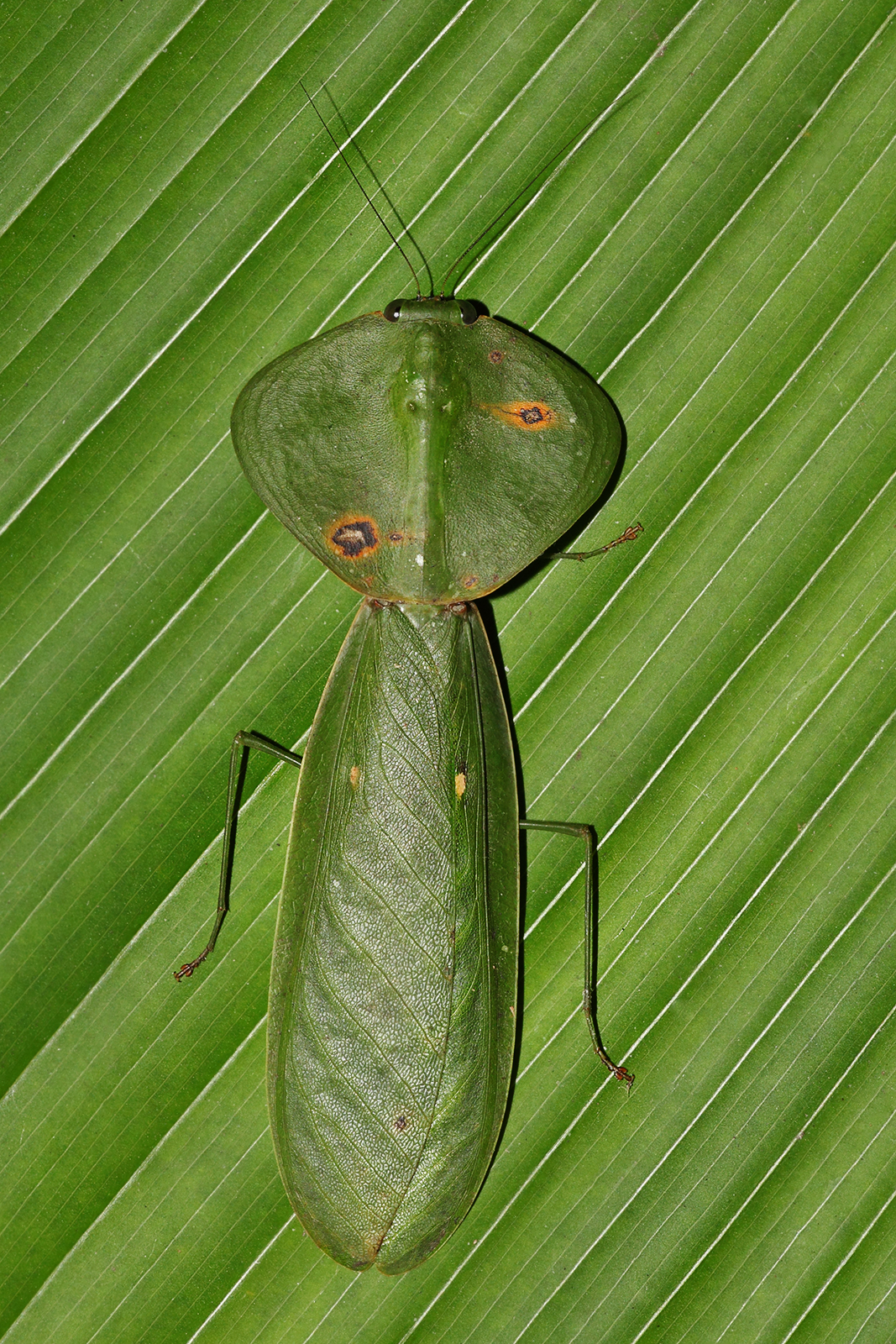
- Male C. rhombicollis, Costa Rica

Scientific classification
- Kingdom: Animalia
- Phylum: Arthropoda
- Clade: Pancrustacea
- Class: Insecta
- Order: Mantodea
- Family: Mantidae
- Genus: Choeradodis
- Species: C. rhombicollis

Binomial name
- Choeradodis rhombicollis Latreille, 1833

Synonyms
- Choeradodis brunneri Wood-Mason, 1882; Choeradodis peruviana Serville, 1839; Choeradodis servillei Wood-Mason, 1880; Mantis rhombicollis (Latreille 1833)

= Choeradodis rhombicollis =

Species of praying mantis

Choeradodis rhombicollis, or Peruvian shield mantis, is a species of praying mantis native to North America, Central America, and South America. It is found in Belize, Costa Rica, Ecuador, French Guiana, Guatemala, Colombia, Mexico, Nicaragua, Panama, Peru, and Suriname. Some specimens can have epizoite living on them.

== Appearance ==
This South American shield mantis, like the sister species in its genus, exhibit a prothorax with a widened pronotum that is shaped like a hood or a leaf. hence one of the animal's names: hooded mantis. Second, the entire body is colored different shades of green, where the ventral side is much lighter than the dorsal side of the hood and the outer wings; which cover translucent inner wings in order to enhance camouflage. Individuals of this species can exhibit other colors such as red, blue, white, and gold on the ventral side of the pronotum.

The raptorial claws of C. rhombicollis are dark green, where the inside of the coxa, femur, and tibia is golden. The femurs of the mantis exhibit large black eyespots in order to aid in threat display against predators. The legs of the mantis are relatively short, most likely to easily tuck under the abdomen in case camouflage is needed.

=== Sexual dimorphism ===
Females of the species will have heads with thin and short antennae, with normal-sized compound eyes compared to the rest of the head. Males have more triangular heads, with big eyes paired with long and thick antennae for seeking out females during breeding season. Second, the shape of the pronotum in males and females is different.

In a nutshell, females have relatively big and rounded pentagon-shaped pronotums; while males will have varying-shaped pronotums. Sometimes, the pronotum is narrow and circular while in other individuals it is rhombus-shaped. In both individuals the ventral side of the hood can exhibit mixtures of light green with the rim of the pronotum being light teal and the bottom portion of the body part exhibiting large blotches of gold with small white bumps.

The lower half of a male C. rhombicollis' full body is longer and slimmer than what would be exhibited by a female. Males have long and slim abdomens with 7-9 segments. The ventral side is light green and the dorsal side is a contrasting bright red, hidden by the wings when not flying. Their hindwings are translucent with veins and a fade into bright red where the wing attaches to the body. When closed, the outer and hindwings create an elongated green teardrop shape.

Female C. rhombicollis exhibit entirely green oval-shaped abdomens with 5-6 segments. The hindwings start off as a lime color and then fade into yellow and then into bright red where the wing connects to the body. When closed, the front wings and the hindwings create an oval shape.

== Life cycle ==
C. rhombicollis start life by hatching from an ootheca with 30-50 eggs. The first instars have very slim pronotums, almost like a normal mantis, but as they molt through life the hood will expand further from a hexagonal shape into a rhombus/pentagonal shape depending on the gender of the mantis. After the wet season, sometime after September, the mantises will find mates, copulate, and lay eggs a few days after.

== Behaviour ==
The species can resemble both living and dead leaves. In either case, they choose a position beside a leaf that they resemble. To further enhance their camouflage, when disturbed, they can gently vibrate - mimicking the motion of the wind over a leaf. To catch prey, they use a "sit and wait" strategy, feeding on a large variety of arthropods. Larger individuals have been observed catching and consuming prey such as lizards and even hummingbirds.

== See also ==
- List of mantis genera and species
