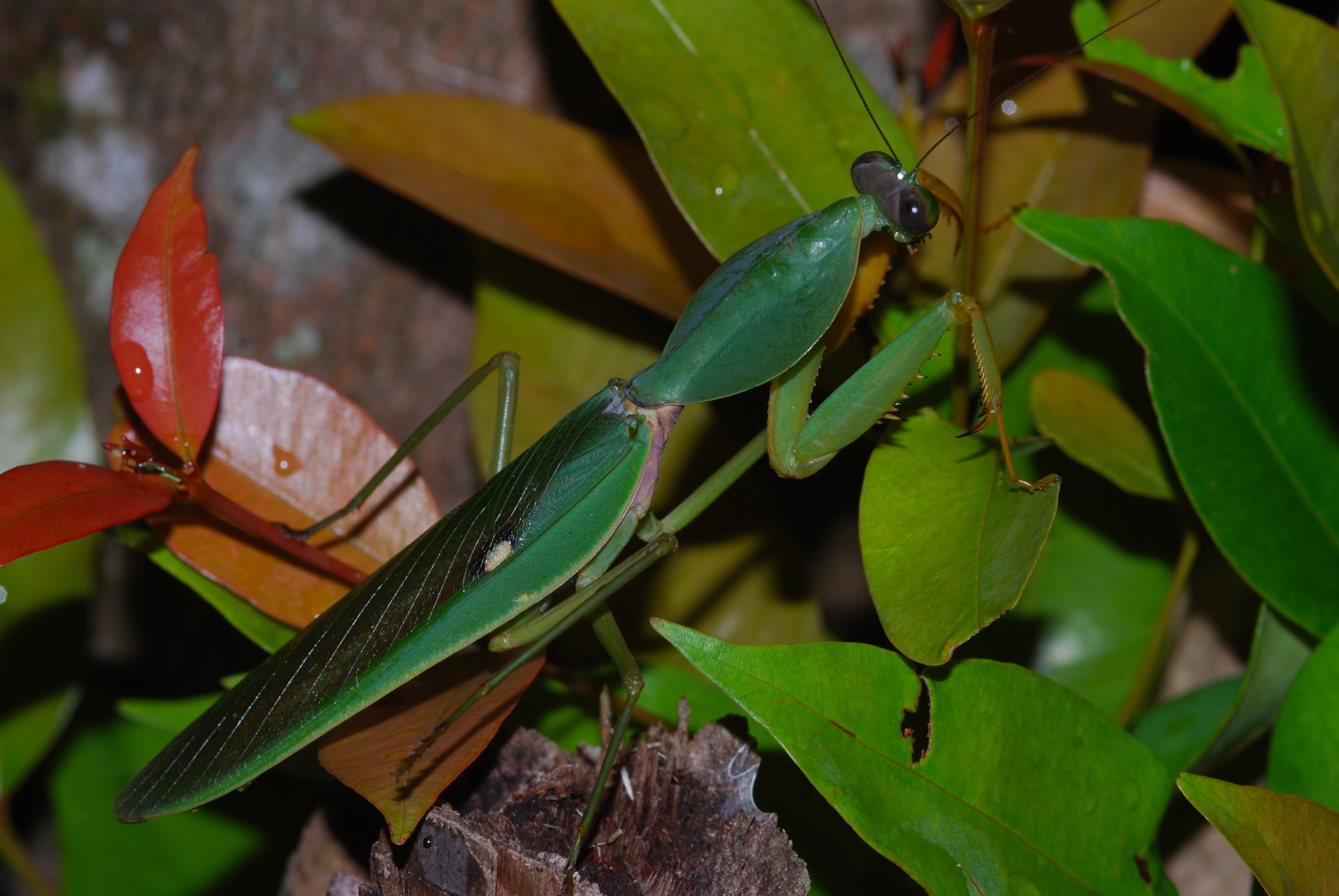
- Adult male from Kuala Tahan, Pahang, Malaysia

Scientific classification
- Kingdom: Animalia
- Phylum: Arthropoda
- Clade: Pancrustacea
- Class: Insecta
- Order: Mantodea
- Family: Mantidae
- Subfamily: Hierodulinae
- Tribe: Hierodulini
- Genus: Rhombodera
- Species: R. basalis

Binomial name
- Rhombodera basalis de Haan, 1842

Synonyms
- Rhombodera deflexa Saussure, 1871

= Rhombodera basalis =

Species of praying mantis

Rhombodera basalis known as Giant Malaysian Shield Mantis, is a species of praying mantis of the genus Rhombodera. It is found in Malaysia, Indonesia, Thailand, Singapore and Borneo.

== Description ==
Rhombodera basalis is a large mantis, reaching up to 10 centimeters. Most individuals are green in color. As their name would suggest, their thorax is in the shape of an elliptical shield, which helps them camouflage better. They differ from other members of the genus, such as R. valida and R. latipronotum by their shield being narrower.

== Habitat ==
R. basalis commonly lives in trees and bushes. It prefers warm, humid environments to thrive in.

== Lifespan ==
R. basalis is very long-lived, with females live up to two years. Males live up to 1.5 years.

== Gallery ==
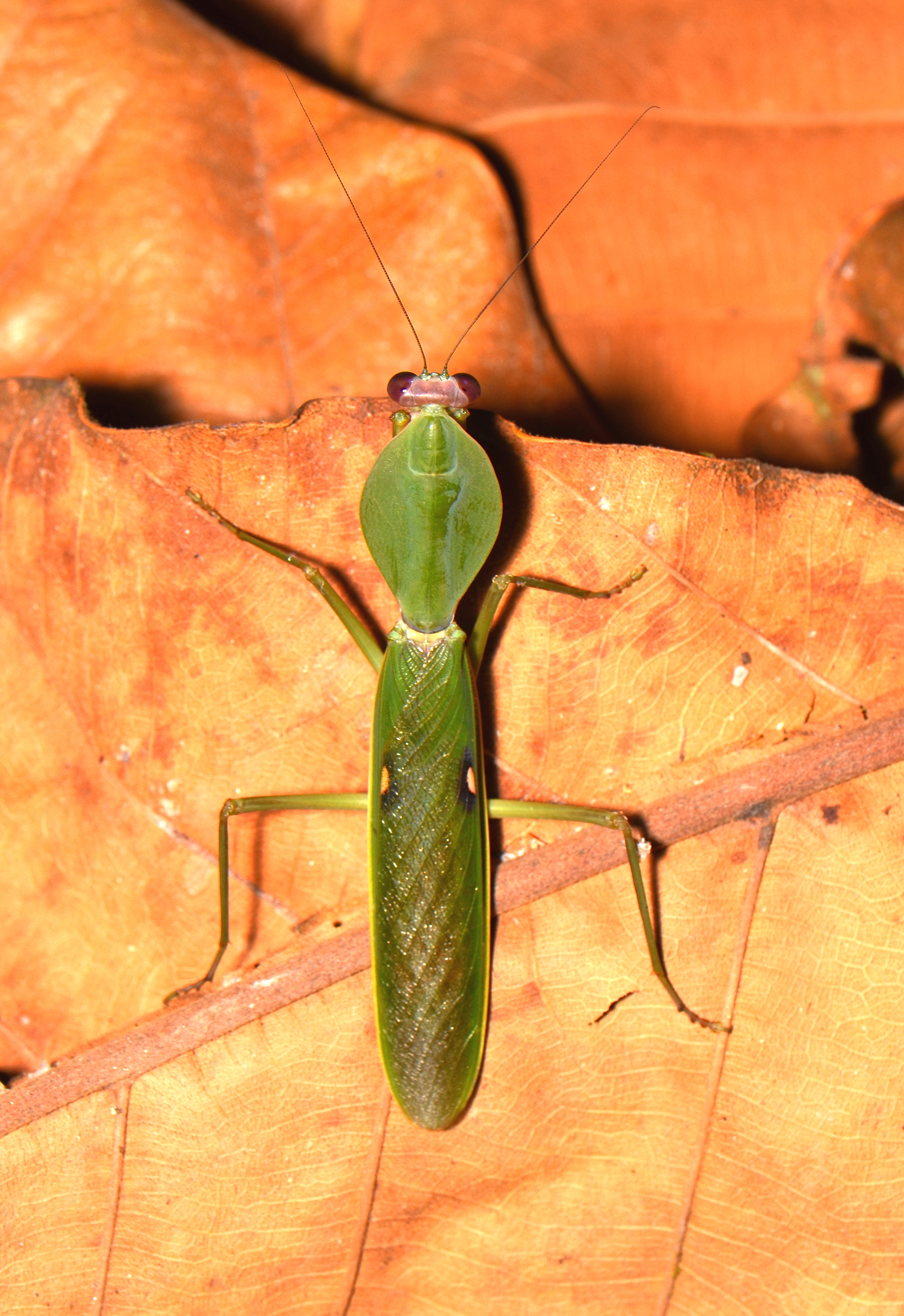
Dorsal view of adult male

== See also ==
- List of mantis genera and species
