= Choeradodis rhomboidea =

- Illustration of a male

Scientific classification
- Kingdom: Animalia
- Phylum: Arthropoda
- Clade: Pancrustacea
- Class: Insecta
- Order: Mantodea
- Family: Mantidae
- Genus: Choeradodis
- Species: C. rhomboidea

Binomial name
- Choeradodis rhomboidea Stoll 1813

Synonyms
- Choeradodis hyalina Serville, 1831; Choeradodis laticollis Serville, 1831; Mantis rhomboidea (Stoll 1813)

Species of praying mantis

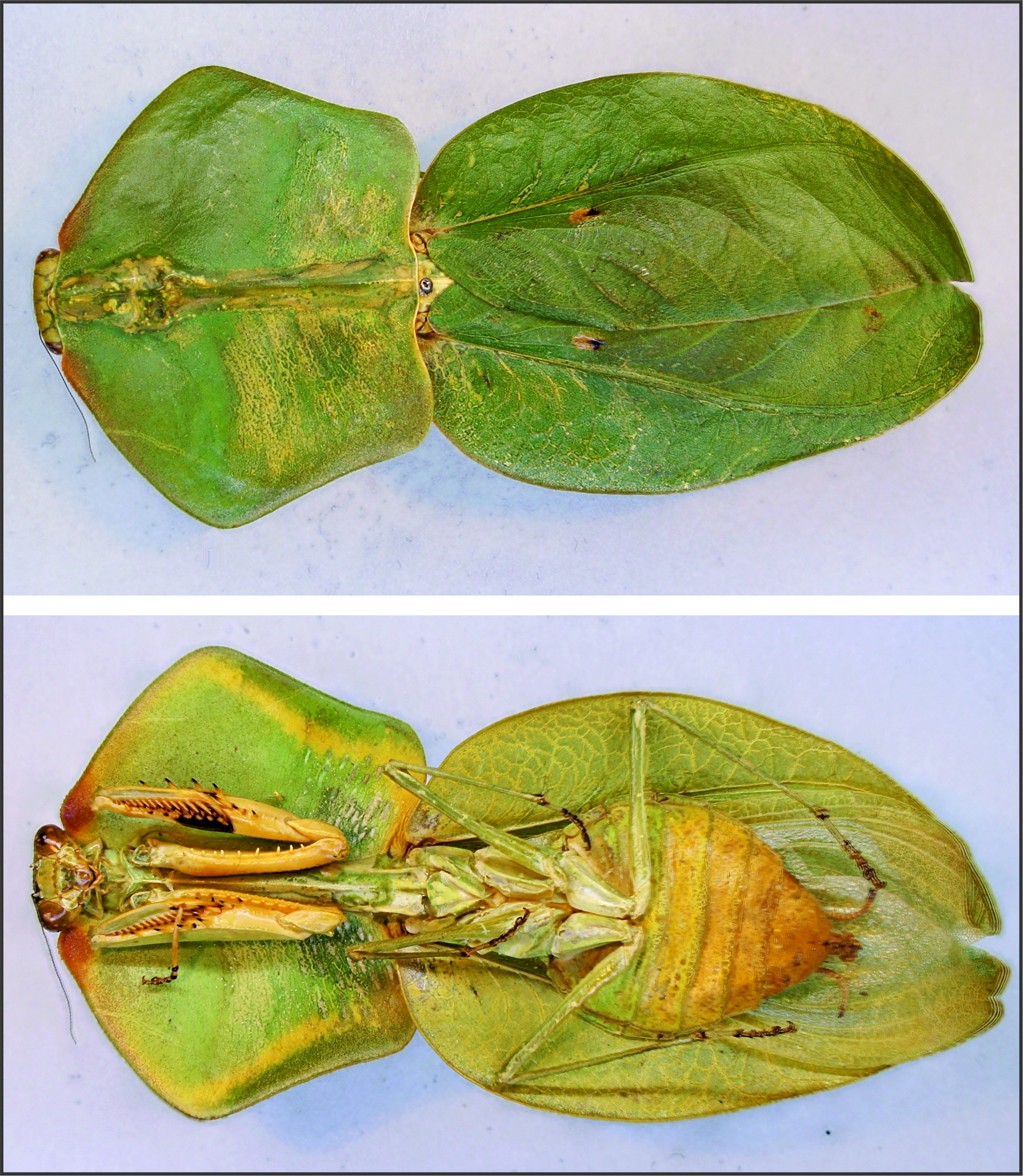
Female specimen at Zoologische Staatssammlung München

Choeradodis rhomboidea, common names Tropical Shield Mantis, Hood Mantis, Hooded Mantis, Cobra Mantis, and Leaf mantis, is a South American species of praying mantis, restricted to the Amazon and Guiana Shield.

== See also ==
- List of mantis genera and species
