= Shield mantis =

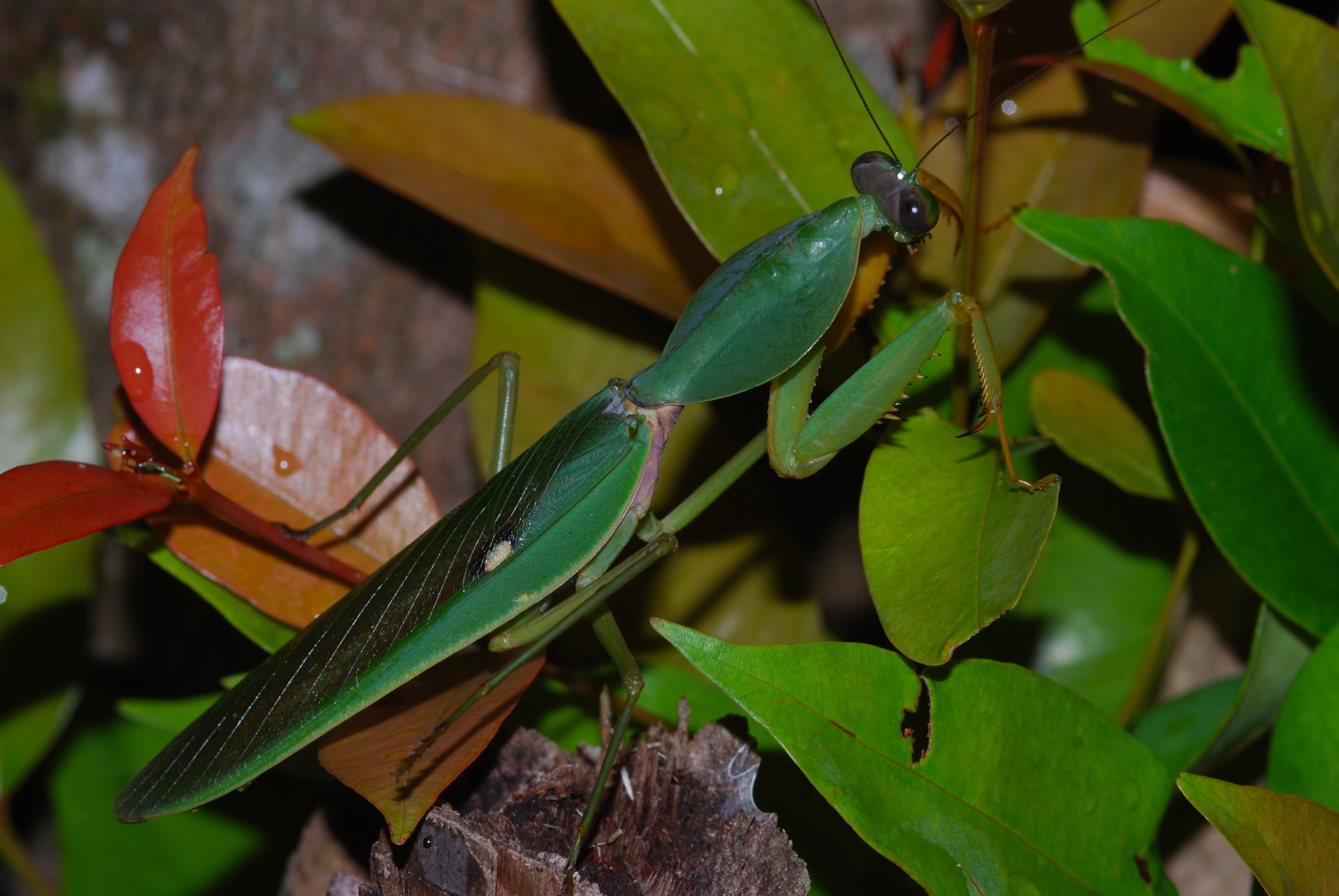
Giant Shield Mantis (Rhombodera basalis)

Shield mantis, hood mantis (or hooded mantis) and leaf mantis (or leafy mantis) are common names for certain praying mantises with an extended thorax aiding it in camouflage and leaf mimicry. The terms are used for species in the following genera:

- Asiadodis
- Choeradodis
- Rhombodera
- Tamolanica

== See also ==
- List of mantis genera and species
- Leaf mantis
