= Leaf mantis =

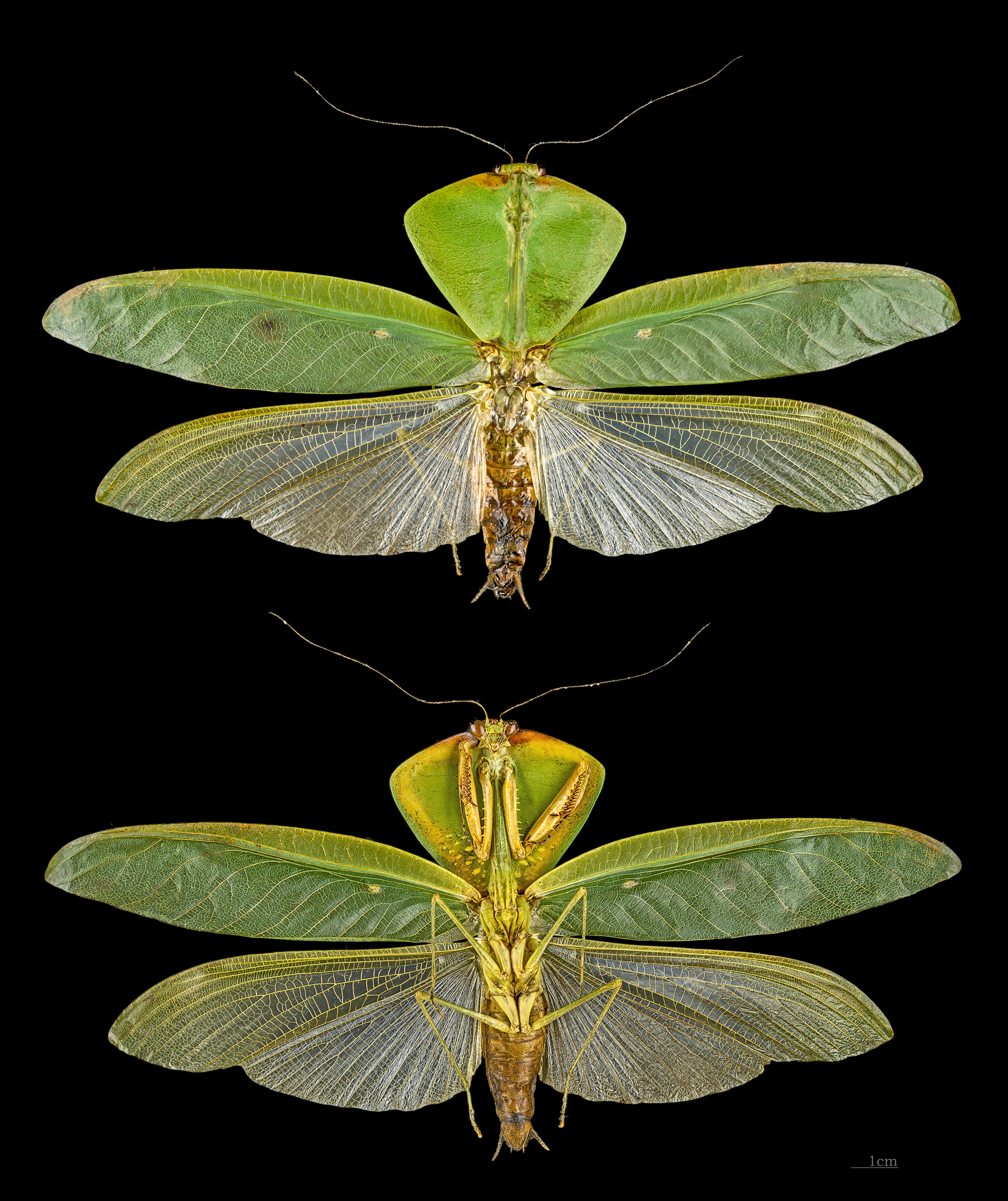
Choeradodis stalii

Leaf mantis (and leafy mantis) is a common name for certain praying mantises including:

- those often also called shield mantis, i.e. species within Choeradodis, Rhombodera, and similar genera
- Dead leaf mantis species such as those within genus Deroplatys

== See also ==
- List of mantis genera and species
