= Stick mantis =

Common name for several praying mantises

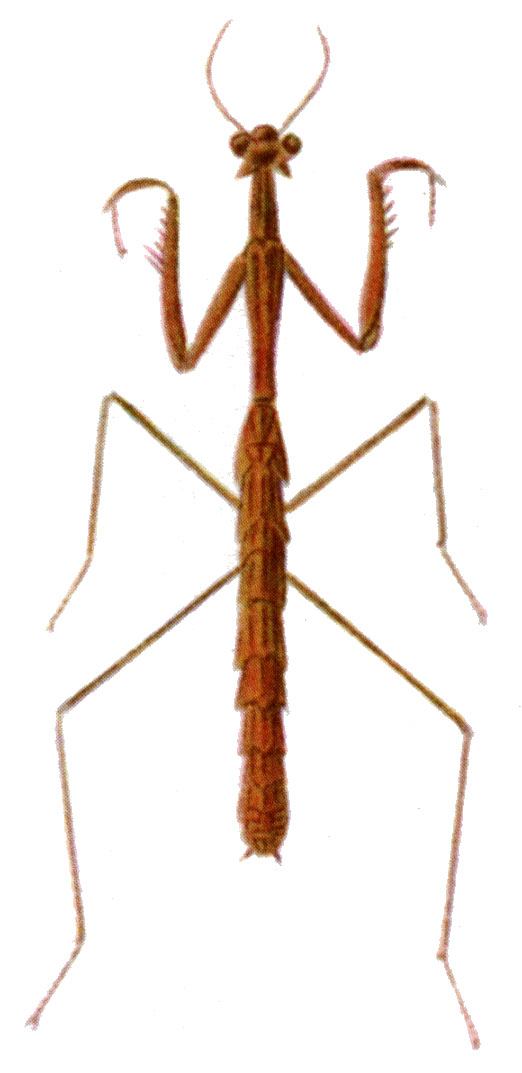
Hoplocorypha macra, a species of African stick mantis. Illustration by M. Beier, 1935

Stick mantis and twig mantis are common names applied to numerous species of mantis that mimic sticks or twigs as camouflage. Often the name serves to identify entire genera such as is the case with:

- Brunneria (including Brunner's stick mantis, the Brazilian stick mantis and the small-winged stick mantis)
- Hoplocorypha (the African stick mantises)
- Paratoxodera (including the Borneo stick mantis and the giant Malaysian stick mantis)
- Popa (African twig mantis)

In cases, some but not all members of a genera are called by a variation of one of these names. For example:

- Archimantis latistyla (Australian stick mantis)
- Pseudovates peruviana (Peruvian stick mantis)

== Similar insects ==
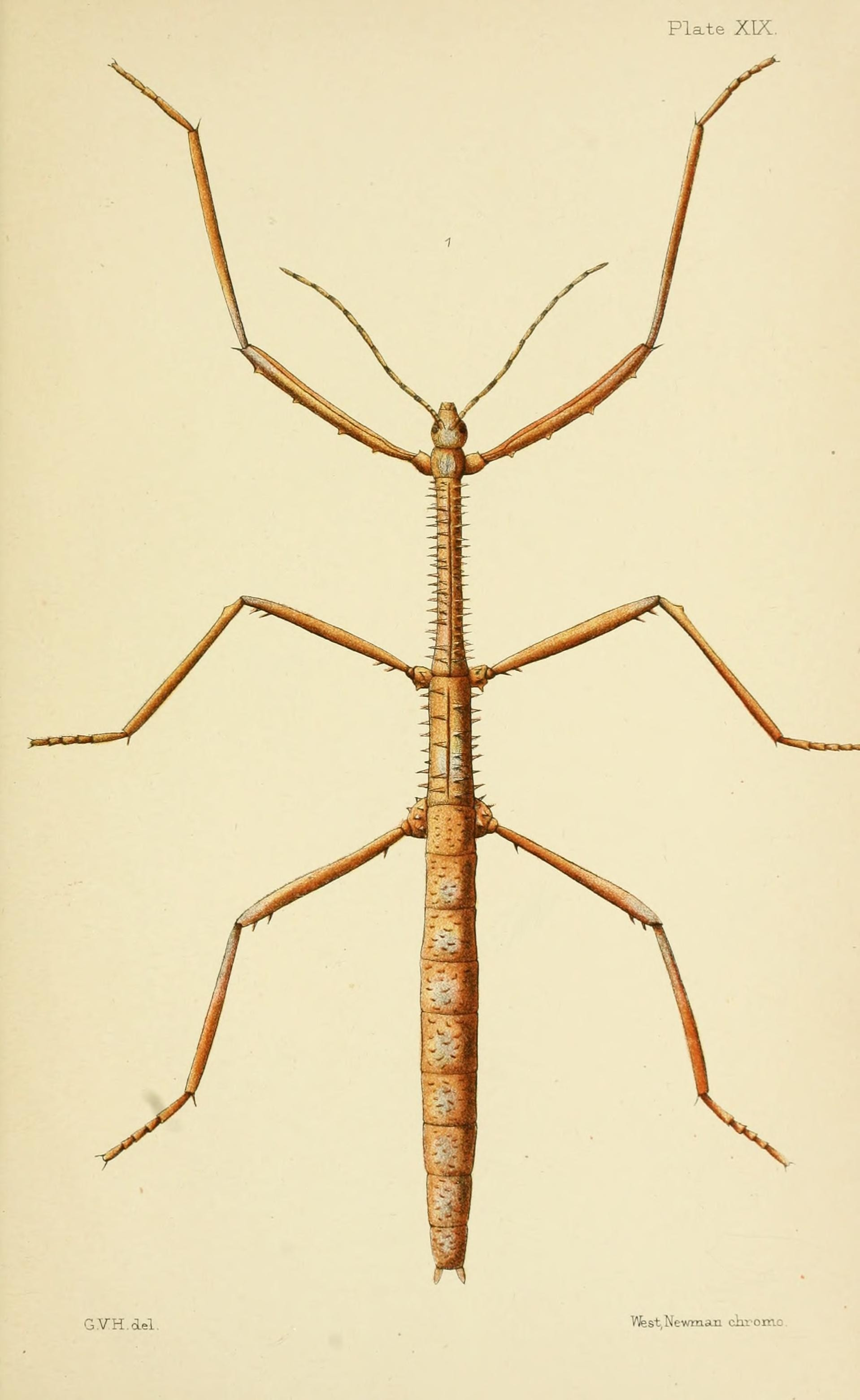
The stick insect Argosarchus horridus belongs to the Phasmatodea, not to the stick mantises. Illustration by George Vernon Hudson, 1892

Stick mantises should not be confused with stick insects (Phasmatodea) although the latter were long-considered close relatives of all mantises according to classification which is now often considered paraphyletic and outdated. Likewise, both mantises and stick insects are separate from the recently identified Mantophasmatodea.

== See also ==
- Grass mantis
- Dead leaf mantis
- Flower mantis
- List of mantis genera and species
