= O. tricolor =

O. tricolor may refer to:

- Octomeria tricolor, an orchid species endemic to southeastern Brazil
- Oliva tricolor, a sea snail species
- Onchidium tricolor, an air-breathing sea slug species
- Oxyothespis tricolor, a praying mantis species

== See also ==
- Tricolor (disambiguation)
