= Giant mantis =

Giant mantis may refer to:

== Insects ==
- Hierodula, a genus of praying mantids, which contains several species with common name giant Asian mantis
  - Hierodula patellifera, also named giant Asian mantis, species of praying mantis within the genus Hierodula
- Deroplatys desiccata, or giant dead leaf mantis, a species of praying mantis of genus Deroplatys.
- Hierodula majuscula, also named giant rainforest mantis and the Australian giant mantis, species of praying mantis within the genus Hierodula
- Idolomantis diabolica, also named giant devil's flower mantis, the single species of praying mantis of genus Idolomantis.
- Paratoxodera cornicollis, or giant Malaysian stick mantis, a species of praying mantis of genus Paratoxodera.
- Tenodera aridifolia, also called Japanese giant mantis, a species of mantis in the subfamily Tenoderinae.
- Tenodera sinensis, also called the Chinese mantis, a species of mantis in the subfamily Tenoderinae that is nearly identical to T. aridifolia

== In fiction ==
- Giant praying mantis, a monster in the 3rd edition of the Dungeons & Dragons role-playing game
- Gargantuan praying mantis, a monster in the 2nd edition of the Advanced Dungeons & Dragons role-playing game
- Giant praying mantis, a fictional creature in the novella A Shocker on Shock Street from the Goosebumps series
- Kamacuras, a kaiju film monster from Son of Godzilla and other films, called Gimantis in the U.S. version, a mutated giant mantis species
