= Aethalochroa affinis =

Scientific classification
- Kingdom: Animalia
- Phylum: Arthropoda
- Clade: Pancrustacea
- Class: Insecta
- Order: Mantodea
- Family: Toxoderidae
- Genus: Aethalochroa
- Species: A. affinis

Binomial name
- Aethalochroa affinis Wood-Mason, 1889

Species of praying mantis

Aethalochroa affinis, commonly known as the Pakistani stick mantis, is a species of praying mantis in the genus Aethalochroa native to Pakistan.

== See also ==
- List of mantis genera and species
- Stick mantis
