= Aethalochroa insignis =

Scientific classification
- Domain: Eukaryota
- Kingdom: Animalia
- Phylum: Arthropoda
- Class: Insecta
- Order: Mantodea
- Family: Toxoderidae
- Genus: Aethalochroa
- Species: A. insignis

Binomial name
- Aethalochroa insignis Wood-Mason, 1878

Species of praying mantis

Aethalochroa insignis, common name Indian stick mantis, is a species of praying mantis found in India that was originally identified as a variety of A. ashmoliana.

== See also ==
- List of mantis genera and species
