= Calamothespis rourei =

Scientific classification
- Domain: Eukaryota
- Kingdom: Animalia
- Phylum: Arthropoda
- Class: Insecta
- Order: Mantodea
- Family: Toxoderidae
- Genus: Calamothespis
- Species: C. rourei

Binomial name
- Calamothespis rourei Chopard, 1941

Species of praying mantis

Calamothespis rourei is a species of praying mantis in the family Toxoderidae.

== See also ==
- List of mantis genera and species
