= Sinaiella sabulosa =

Scientific classification
- Kingdom: Animalia
- Phylum: Arthropoda
- Clade: Pancrustacea
- Class: Insecta
- Order: Mantodea
- Family: Toxoderidae
- Genus: Sinaiella
- Species: S. sabulosa

Binomial name
- Sinaiella sabulosa Uvarov, 1939

Synonyms
- Calidomantis ehrenbergi Werner, 1928; Miomantis ehrenbergi (Werner, 1928)

Species of praying mantis

Sinaiella sabulosa is a species of praying mantis in the family Toxoderidae, endemic to Egypt and the Arabian Peninsula.

== See also ==
- Mantises of Africa
- List of mantis genera and species
