= Paratoxodera meggitti =

Scientific classification
- Kingdom: Animalia
- Phylum: Arthropoda
- Clade: Pancrustacea
- Class: Insecta
- Order: Mantodea
- Family: Toxoderidae
- Genus: Paratoxodera
- Species: P. meggitti

Binomial name
- Paratoxodera meggitti Uvarov, 1927

Species of praying mantis

Paratoxodera meggitti is a species of praying mantis found in southern China, Myanmar, West Malaysia, and Borneo.

== See also ==
- List of mantis genera and species
