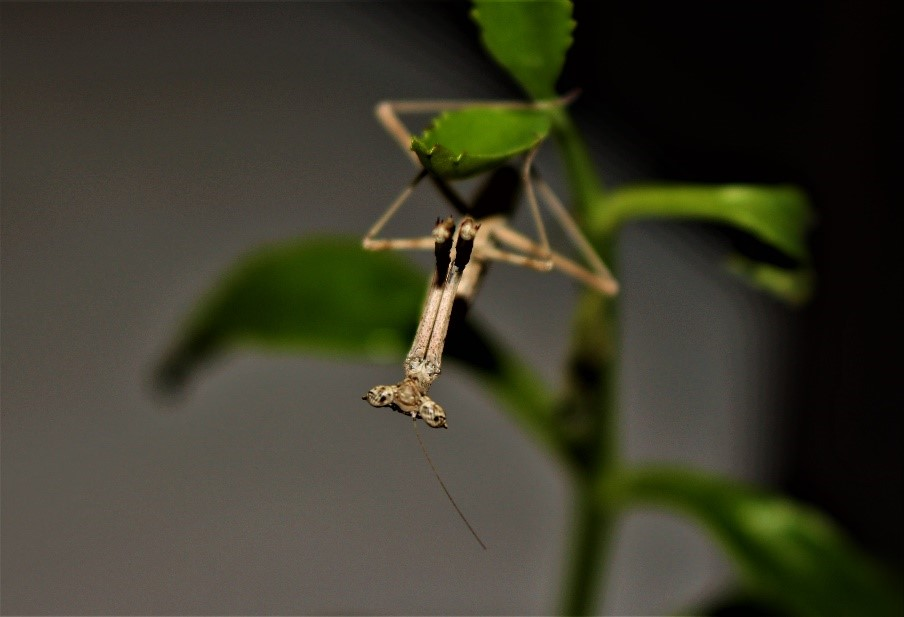
- Imago, Iran

Scientific classification
- Domain: Eukaryota
- Kingdom: Animalia
- Phylum: Arthropoda
- Class: Insecta
- Order: Mantodea
- Family: Toxoderidae
- Genus: Oxyothespis
- Species: O. persica

Binomial name
- Oxyothespis persica Bolivar, 1913

= Oxyothespis persica =

Species of praying mantis

Oxyothespis persica is a species of praying mantis in the family Toxoderidae.

== See also ==
- List of mantis genera and species
