= Paratoxodera gigliotosi =

Scientific classification
- Kingdom: Animalia
- Phylum: Arthropoda
- Clade: Pancrustacea
- Class: Insecta
- Order: Mantodea
- Family: Toxoderidae
- Subfamily: Toxoderinae
- Tribe: Toxoderini
- Genus: Paratoxodera
- Species: P. gigliotosi

Binomial name
- Paratoxodera gigliotosi Roy, 2009

Species of praying mantis

Paratoxodera gigliotosi is a species of praying mantis found West Malaysia. This species is often confused with Paratoxodera cornicollis as they are similar in appearance. However, their geographical distribution is noticeably different.

== See also ==
- List of mantis genera and species
