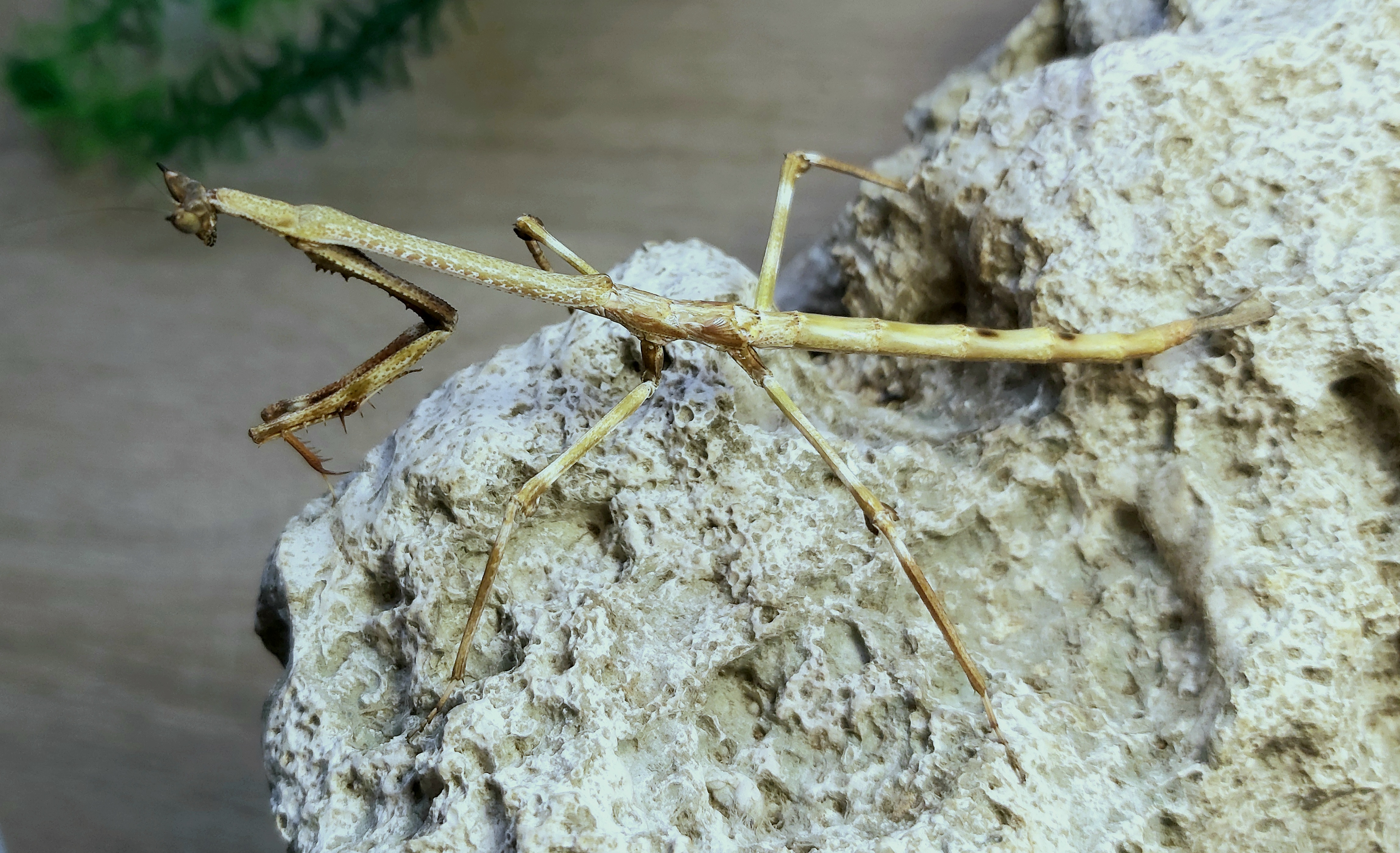
- Nymph

Scientific classification
- Kingdom: Animalia
- Phylum: Arthropoda
- Clade: Pancrustacea
- Class: Insecta
- Order: Mantodea
- Family: Toxoderidae
- Genus: Heterochaeta
- Species: H. orientalis

Binomial name
- Heterochaeta orientalis Gerstaecker, 1883

= Heterochaeta orientalis =

Species of mantis

Heterochaeta orientalis is a species of mantis from the family Toxoderidae native to Africa. It is known by various common names including cat-eye mantis or giant african stick mantis.

== Description ==
It is a stick mimicking species, with a thin and elongated thorax and abdomen.

== Distribution ==
iNaturalist observations of H. orientalis have been made across Africa, such as in Ethiopia, Tanzania, Mozambique, Namibia, Zambia, South Africa, Nigeria or Senegal.

== See also ==
- List of mantis genera and species
