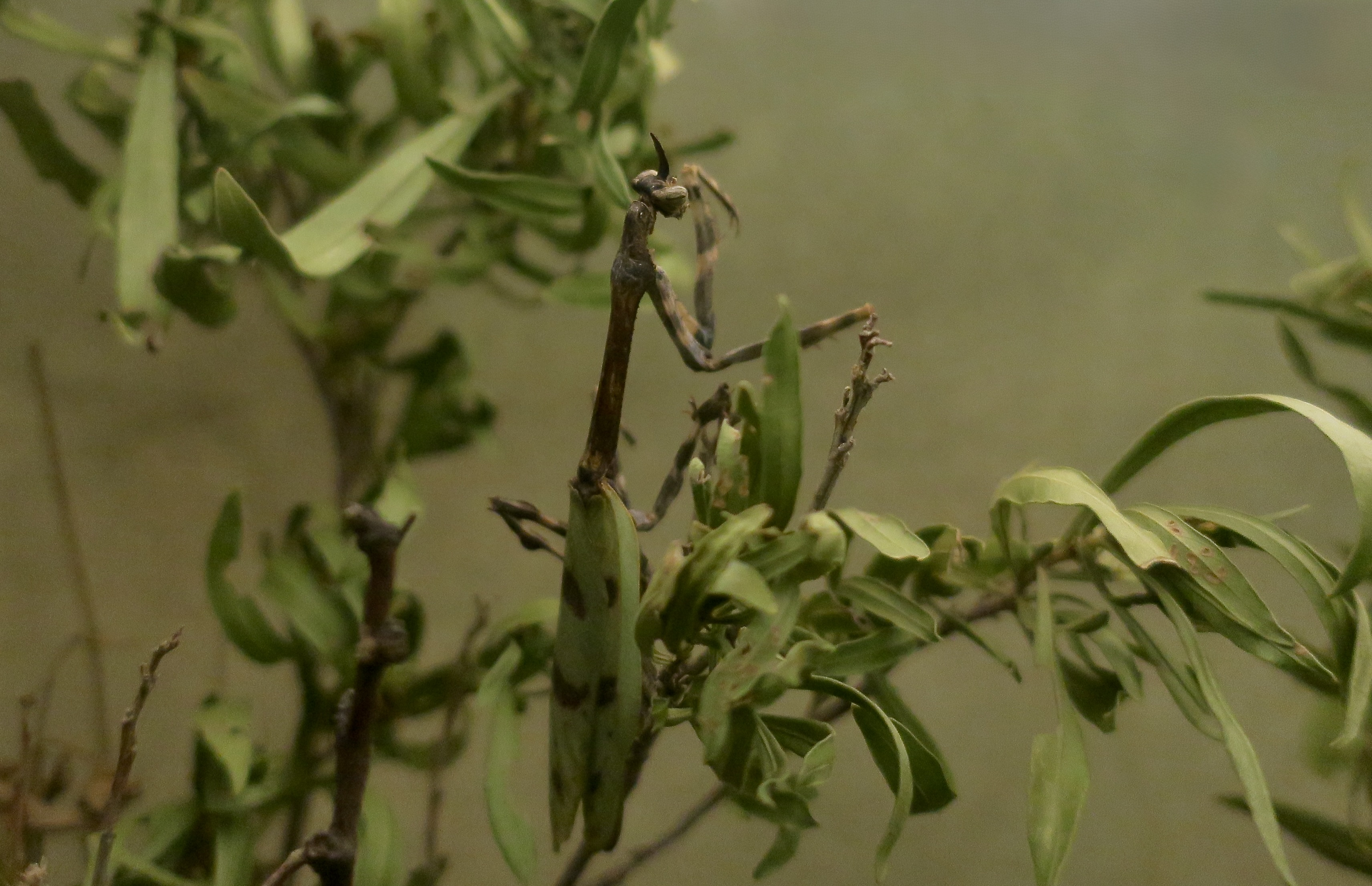
- At Arizona-Sonora Desert Museum.

Scientific classification
- Kingdom: Animalia
- Phylum: Arthropoda
- Clade: Pancrustacea
- Class: Insecta
- Order: Mantodea
- Family: Mantidae
- Genus: Pseudovates
- Species: P. arizonae

Binomial name
- Pseudovates arizonae Hebard, 1935

= Pseudovates arizonae =

Species of praying mantis

Pseudovates arizonae, common name Arizona unicorn mantis, is a species of praying mantis native to North America and is only found in the state of Arizona. At least three other related Pseudovates are found in Mexico, and a similar-looking species from the genus Phyllovates is found in Texas.

== Background ==
This species is easy to tell from the similar-looking Texas unicorn mantis Phyllovates chlorophaea because it has lobes on the legs and sides of the abdomen. It is also more brightly colored and averages smaller in the wild (captive specimens are more variable due to rearing differences).

== See also ==
- Arizona mantis
- Unicorn mantis
- List of mantis genera and species
