= Brunneria longa =

Scientific classification
- Kingdom: Animalia
- Phylum: Arthropoda
- Clade: Pancrustacea
- Class: Insecta
- Order: Mantodea
- Family: Coptopterygidae
- Genus: Brunneria
- Species: B. longa

Binomial name
- Brunneria longa Giglio-Tos, 1915

Species of praying mantis

Brunneria longa is a species of praying mantis found in Brazil and Bolivia.
