= Calamothespis subcornuta =

Scientific classification
- Kingdom: Animalia
- Phylum: Arthropoda
- Clade: Pancrustacea
- Class: Insecta
- Order: Mantodea
- Family: Toxoderidae
- Genus: Calamothespis
- Species: C. subcornuta

Binomial name
- Calamothespis subcornuta La Greca, 1952

Species of praying mantis

Calamothespis subcornuta, the sub-horned calamothespis, is a species of mantis in the family Toxoderidae.

== See also ==
- List of mantis genera and species
