= Stenotoxodera pluto =

Scientific classification
- Domain: Eukaryota
- Kingdom: Animalia
- Phylum: Arthropoda
- Class: Insecta
- Order: Mantodea
- Family: Toxoderidae
- Genus: Stenotoxodera
- Species: S. pluto

Binomial name
- Stenotoxodera pluto (Rehn, 1909)

Synonyms
- Paratoxodera pluto Rehn, 1909

Species of praying mantis

Stenotoxodera pluto is a species of praying mantis found in Malaysia and Sumatra.

== See also ==
- List of mantis genera and species
