= Oxyothespis nilotica =

Scientific classification
- Kingdom: Animalia
- Phylum: Arthropoda
- Class: Insecta
- Order: Mantodea
- Family: Toxoderidae
- Genus: Oxyothespis
- Species: O. nilotica

Binomial name
- Oxyothespis nilotica Giglio-Tos, 1916

Species of praying mantis

Oxyothespis nilotica is a species of praying mantis in the family Toxoderidae.

== See also ==
- List of mantis genera and species
