= Aethalochroa spinipes =

Scientific classification
- Kingdom: Animalia
- Phylum: Arthropoda
- Clade: Pancrustacea
- Class: Insecta
- Order: Mantodea
- Family: Toxoderidae
- Genus: Aethalochroa
- Species: A. spinipes

Binomial name
- Aethalochroa spinipes Wood-Mason, 1889

Species of praying mantis

Aethalochroa spinipes, common name stick mantis, is a species of praying mantis native to Pakistan and India.

== See also ==
- List of mantis genera and species
