= Brunneria gracilis =

Scientific classification
- Kingdom: Animalia
- Phylum: Arthropoda
- Clade: Pancrustacea
- Class: Insecta
- Order: Mantodea
- Family: Coptopterygidae
- Genus: Brunneria
- Species: B. gracilis

Binomial name
- Brunneria gracilis Giglio-Tos, 1915

Species of praying mantis

Brunneria gracilis is a species of praying mantis found in Argentina, Brazil, Paraguay, Uruguay, and Venezuela.
