= Toxodera fimbriata =

Scientific classification
- Kingdom: Animalia
- Phylum: Arthropoda
- Clade: Pancrustacea
- Class: Insecta
- Order: Mantodea
- Family: Toxoderidae
- Subfamily: Toxoderinae
- Tribe: Toxoderini
- Genus: Toxodera
- Species: T. fimbriata

Binomial name
- Toxodera fimbriata Werner, 1930

Synonyms
- Toxodera spinigera Beier, 1931

Species of praying mantis

Toxodera fimbriata, common name feathered mantis, is a species of praying mantis found in Myanmar, Malay Peninsula, Sumatra, and Borneo. This species is easily distinguished by others of the genera by their strong curved pronotum.

== See also ==
- List of mantis genera and species
