= Calamothespis taylori =

Scientific classification
- Kingdom: Animalia
- Phylum: Arthropoda
- Clade: Pancrustacea
- Class: Insecta
- Order: Mantodea
- Family: Toxoderidae
- Genus: Calamothespis
- Species: C. taylori

Binomial name
- Calamothespis taylori La Greca, 1952

Species of praying mantis

Calamothespis taylori, Taylor's calamothespis, is a species of praying mantis in the family Toxoderidae.

== See also ==
- List of mantis genera and species
