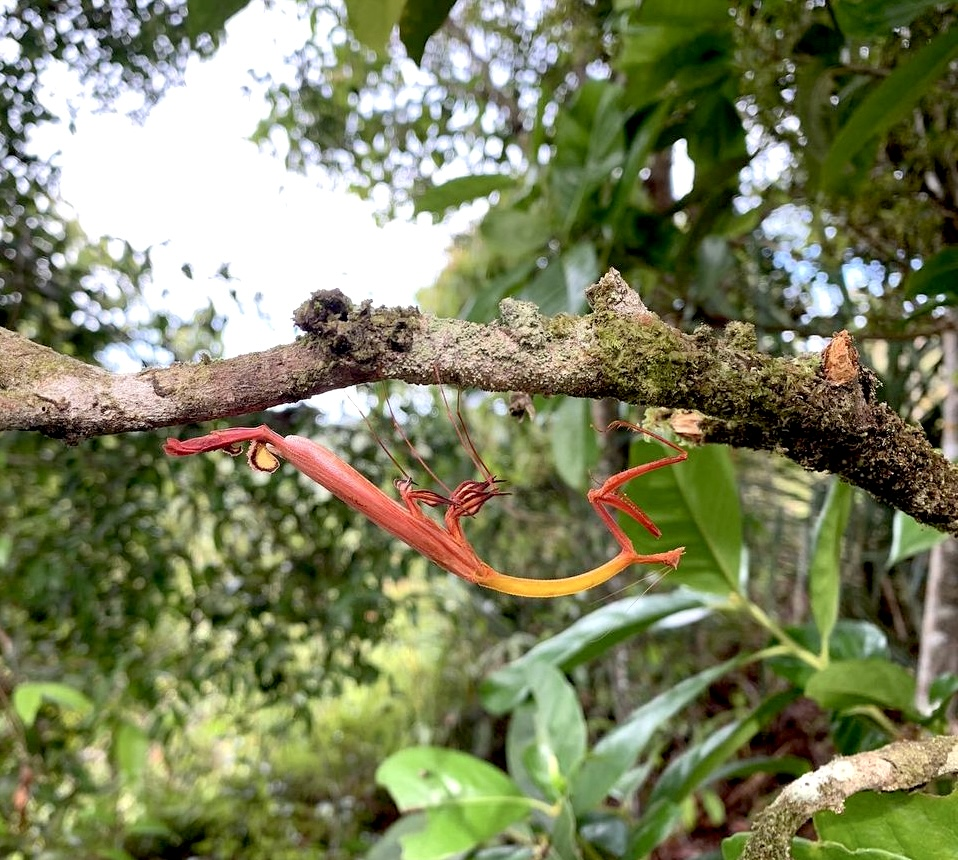

Scientific classification
- Kingdom: Animalia
- Phylum: Arthropoda
- Clade: Pancrustacea
- Class: Insecta
- Order: Mantodea
- Family: Toxoderidae
- Genus: Toxodera
- Species: T. integrifolia

Binomial name
- Toxodera integrifolia Werner, 1925

= Toxodera integrifolia =

Species of praying mantis

Toxodera integrifolia is a species of praying mantis characterised by its red-hot colouration that is found in the Malay Peninsula and Northern Borneo.
