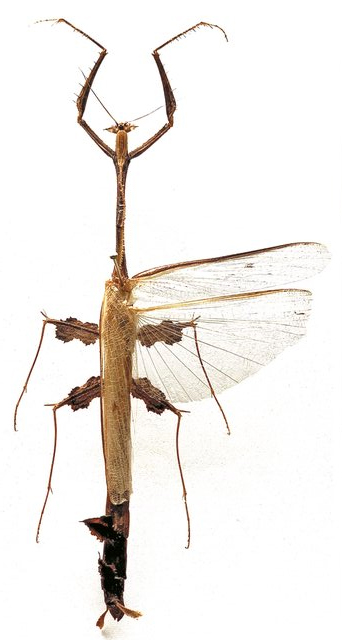
- Toxodera hauseri adult female specimen from Borneo in the private collection of Andrew Markey

Scientific classification
- Kingdom: Animalia
- Phylum: Arthropoda
- Clade: Pancrustacea
- Class: Insecta
- Order: Mantodea
- Family: Toxoderidae
- Subfamily: Toxoderinae
- Tribe: Toxoderini
- Genus: Toxodera
- Species: T. hauseri

Binomial name
- Toxodera hauseri Roy, 2009

= Toxodera hauseri =

Species of praying mantis

Toxodera hauseri, the Southeast Asian toxodera, is a species of praying mantis found in Thailand, Malay Peninsula, Java, and Borneo. However, the recorded occurrence from Borneo was based solely on a photographic record from Poring Hot Springs, or at least until the examination of a physical specimen from a private collection validated it. This species closely resembles T. fimbriata but is distinguished by the greater width of the leaf-like expansions of the medial femurs.

== Etymology ==
Named after Austrian entomologist, Dr. Bernd Hauser.

== Additional images ==
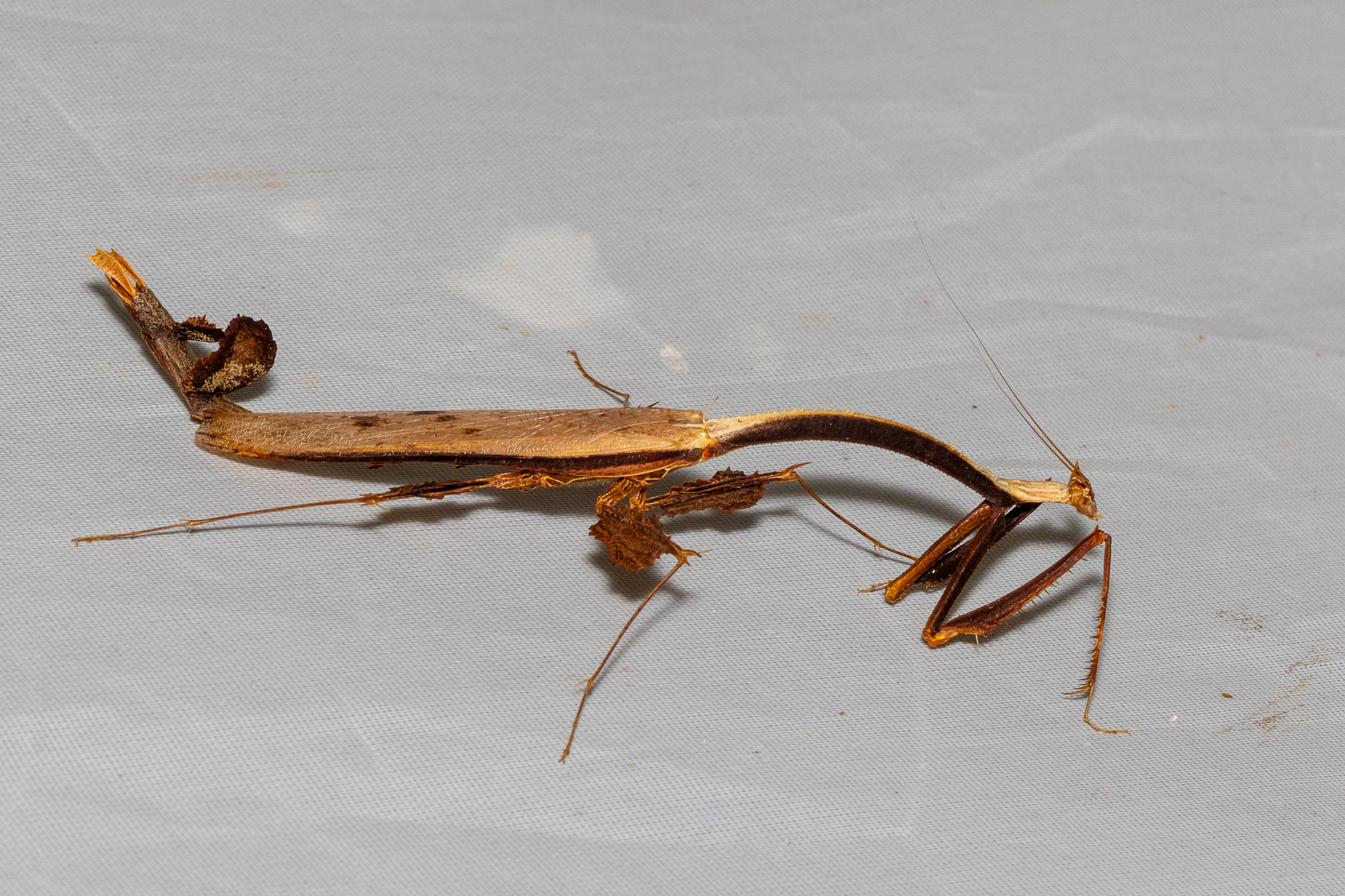
Toxodera hauseri

== See also ==
- List of mantis genera and species
