= Paratoxodera borneana =

Scientific classification
- Domain: Eukaryota
- Kingdom: Animalia
- Phylum: Arthropoda
- Class: Insecta
- Order: Mantodea
- Family: Toxoderidae
- Genus: Paratoxodera
- Species: P. borneana

Binomial name
- Paratoxodera borneana Beier, 1931

Species of praying mantis

Paratoxodera borneana, common name Borneo stick mantis, is a species of praying mantis found in Brunei that was originally identified as a subspecies of P. cornicollis. In 2009 when the tribe Toxoderini was revised, borneana was classified as a morph due to the lack of major characteristics that distinguish it from cornicollis besides for the absence of a second lobe of the pronotum.
