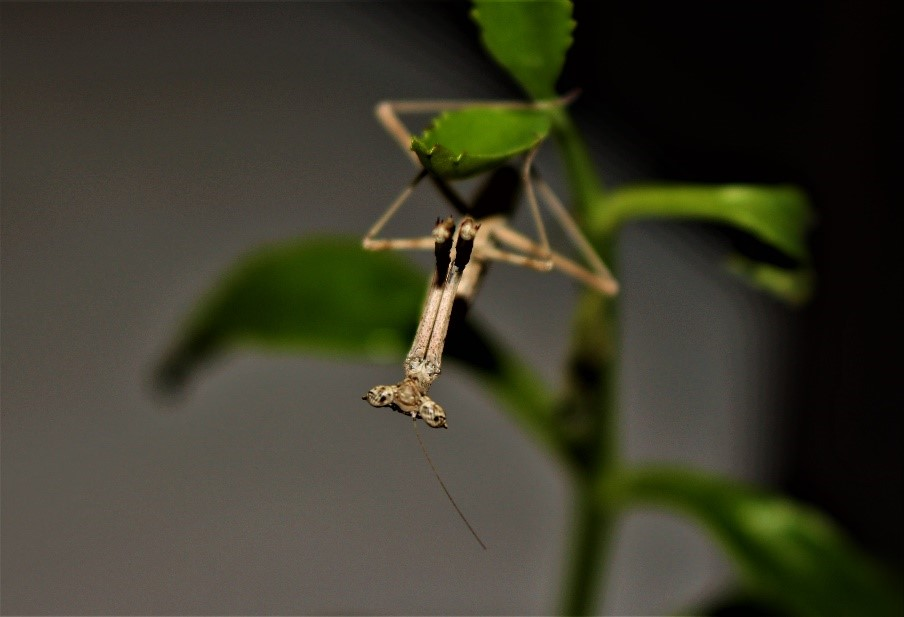
- Oxyothespis persica, Iran

Scientific classification
- Kingdom: Animalia
- Phylum: Arthropoda
- Class: Insecta
- Order: Mantodea
- Family: Toxoderidae
- Tribe: Oxyothespini
- Genus: Oxyothespis; Saussure, 1870

Synonyms
- Oxythespis Saussure, 1871

= Oxyothespis =

Genus of praying mantises

Oxyothespis is a genus of praying mantis in the family Toxoderidae. Members of this genus have been called grass mantises.

== Species ==
The following species are recognised in the genus Oxyothespis:

- Oxyothespis acuticeps
- Oxyothespis alata
- Oxyothespis apostata
- Oxyothespis bifurcata
- Oxyothespis brevicollis
- Oxyothespis brevipennis
- Oxyothespis dumonti (North African grass mantis)
- Oxyothespis flavipennis
- Oxyothespis longicollis
- Oxyothespis longipennis
- Oxyothespis mammillata
- Oxyothespis maroccana
- Oxyothespis meridionalis
- Oxyothespis nilotica
- Oxyothespis noctivaga
- Oxyothespis parva
- Oxyothespis pellucida
- Oxyothespis persica
- Oxyothespis philbyi
- Oxyothespis senegalensis
- Oxyothespis sudanensis
- Oxyothespis tricolor
- Oxyothespis villiersi
- Oxyothespis wagneri

== See also ==
- List of mantis genera and species
