= Oxyothespis dumonti =

Scientific classification
- Kingdom: Animalia
- Phylum: Arthropoda
- Clade: Pancrustacea
- Class: Insecta
- Order: Mantodea
- Family: Toxoderidae
- Genus: Oxyothespis
- Species: O. dumonti

Binomial name
- Oxyothespis dumonti Chopard, 1941

Species of praying mantis

Oxyothespis dumonti, common name North African grass mantis, is a species of praying mantis in the family Toxoderidae. It is found in Africa.

== See also ==
- African mantis
- Grass mantis
- List of mantis genera and species
