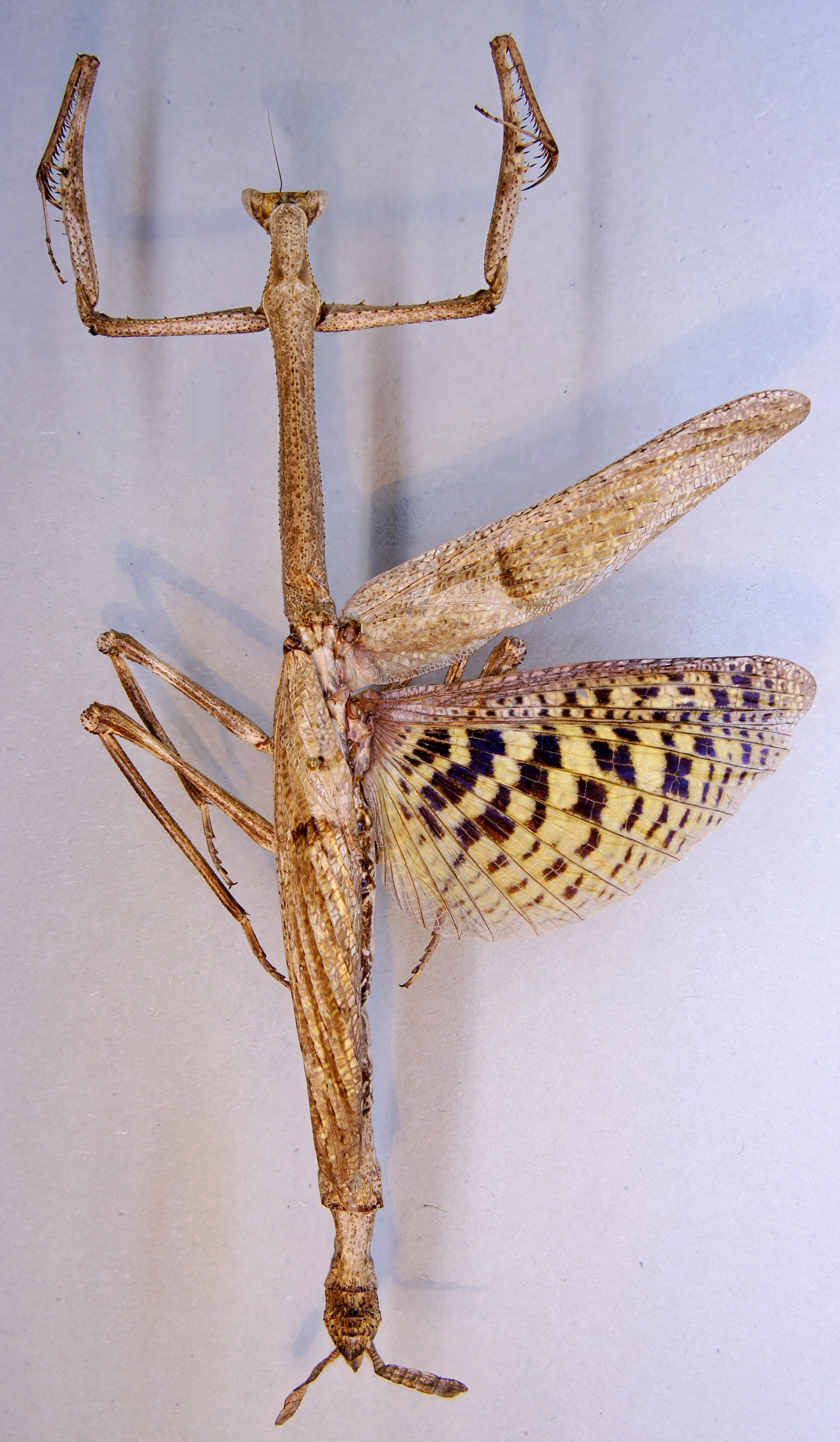
- Pinned specimen

Scientific classification
- Kingdom: Animalia
- Phylum: Arthropoda
- Clade: Pancrustacea
- Class: Insecta
- Order: Mantodea
- Family: Toxoderidae
- Genus: Heterochaeta
- Species: H. strachani

Binomial name
- Heterochaeta strachani Kirby, 1904

= Heterochaeta strachani =

Species of insect

Heterochaeta strachani is a species of stick mantis in the genus Heterochaeta from Ghana.
