= Toxodera maculata =

Scientific classification
- Kingdom: Animalia
- Phylum: Arthropoda
- Clade: Pancrustacea
- Class: Insecta
- Order: Mantodea
- Family: Toxoderidae
- Subfamily: Toxoderinae
- Tribe: Toxoderini
- Genus: Toxodera
- Species: T. maculata

Binomial name
- Toxodera maculata Beier, 1913

Species of praying mantis

Toxodera maculata, the spotted toxodera, is a species of praying mantis found in southern China, Laos, Thailand, West Malaysia, Sumatra, Java, and Borneo. Females have a body length up to 130mm.

== See also ==
- List of mantis genera and species
