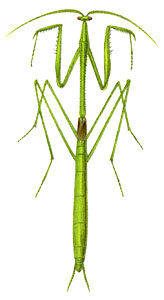
- Brunneria borealis

Scientific classification
- Kingdom: Animalia
- Phylum: Arthropoda
- Clade: Pancrustacea
- Class: Insecta
- Order: Mantodea
- Family: Coptopterygidae
- Genus: Brunneria; Saussure, 1869

= Brunneria =

Genus of praying mantises

Brunneria is a genus of praying mantises in family Mantidae. They are often called stick mantis for their slender shape and the species of the genus are native to the Americas.

== Taxonomy and systematics ==
The following species are recognised in the genus Brunneria:

- Brunneria borealis (Brunner's mantis, Brunner's stick mantis)
- Brunneria brasiliensis (Brazilian stick mantis)
- Brunneria gracilis
- Brunneria longa
- Brunneria orinocensis Anderson, 2026
- Brunneria subaptera Saussure, 1869 (small-winged stick mantis)
- Brunneria xerophila Anderson, 2026

== See also ==
- List of mantis genera and species
