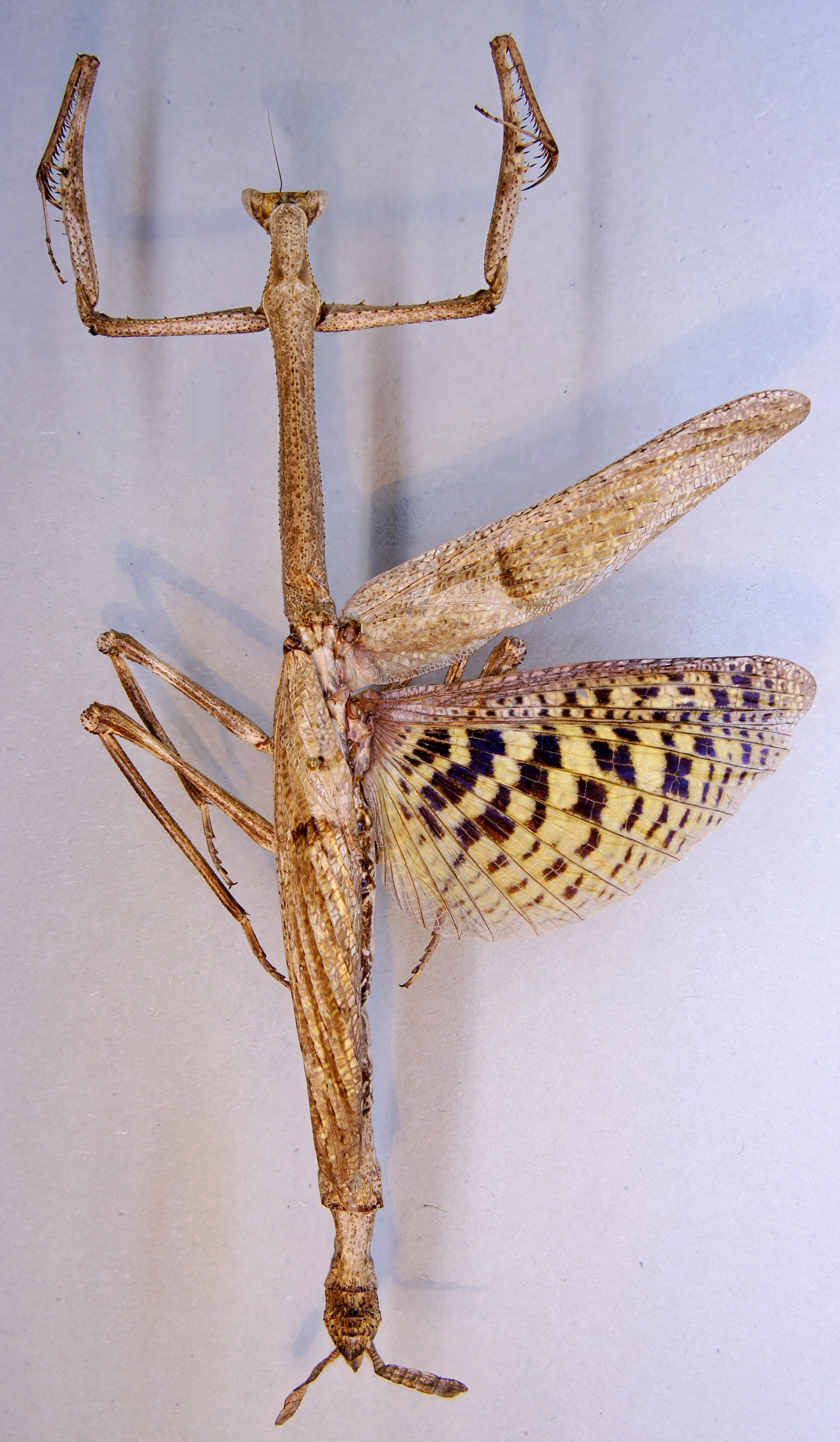
- Heterochaeta strachani

Scientific classification
- Kingdom: Animalia
- Phylum: Arthropoda
- Clade: Pancrustacea
- Class: Insecta
- Order: Mantodea
- Family: Toxoderidae
- Subfamily: Heterochaetinae
- Genus: Heterochaeta; Westwood 1845

Type species
- Heterochaeta tenuipes Westwood, 1841

= Heterochaeta (mantis) =

Genus of mantis

Heterochaeta is a genus of mantis native to Africa. Species in this genus are known as Giant African Stick Mantises.

== Species ==
- Heterochaeta bernardii Roy, 1973
- Heterochaeta girardi Roy, 1975
- Heterochaeta kumari Roy, 1975
- Heterochaeta lamellosa Roy, 1976
- Heterochaeta occidentalis Beier, 1963
- Heterochaeta orientalis Gerstaecker, 1883 (Cat-eyed Mantis, Giant African Stick Mantis)
- Heterochaeta pantherina Saussure, 1872
- Heterochaeta reticulata Roy, 1976
- Heterochaeta strachani Kirby, 1904
- Heterochaeta tenuipes Westwood, 1841
- Heterochaeta zavattarii La Greca, 1951

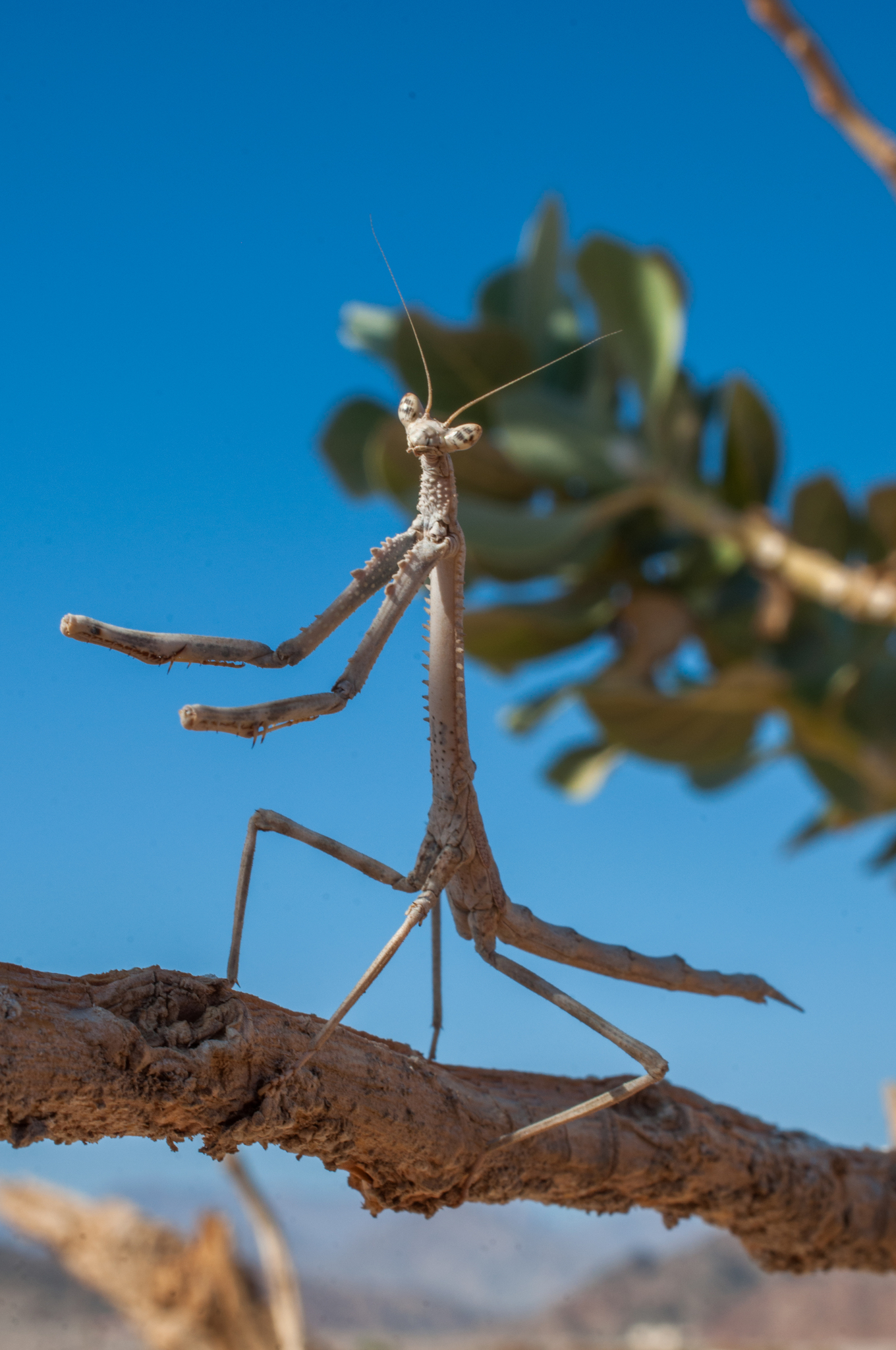
Heterochaeta pantherina
