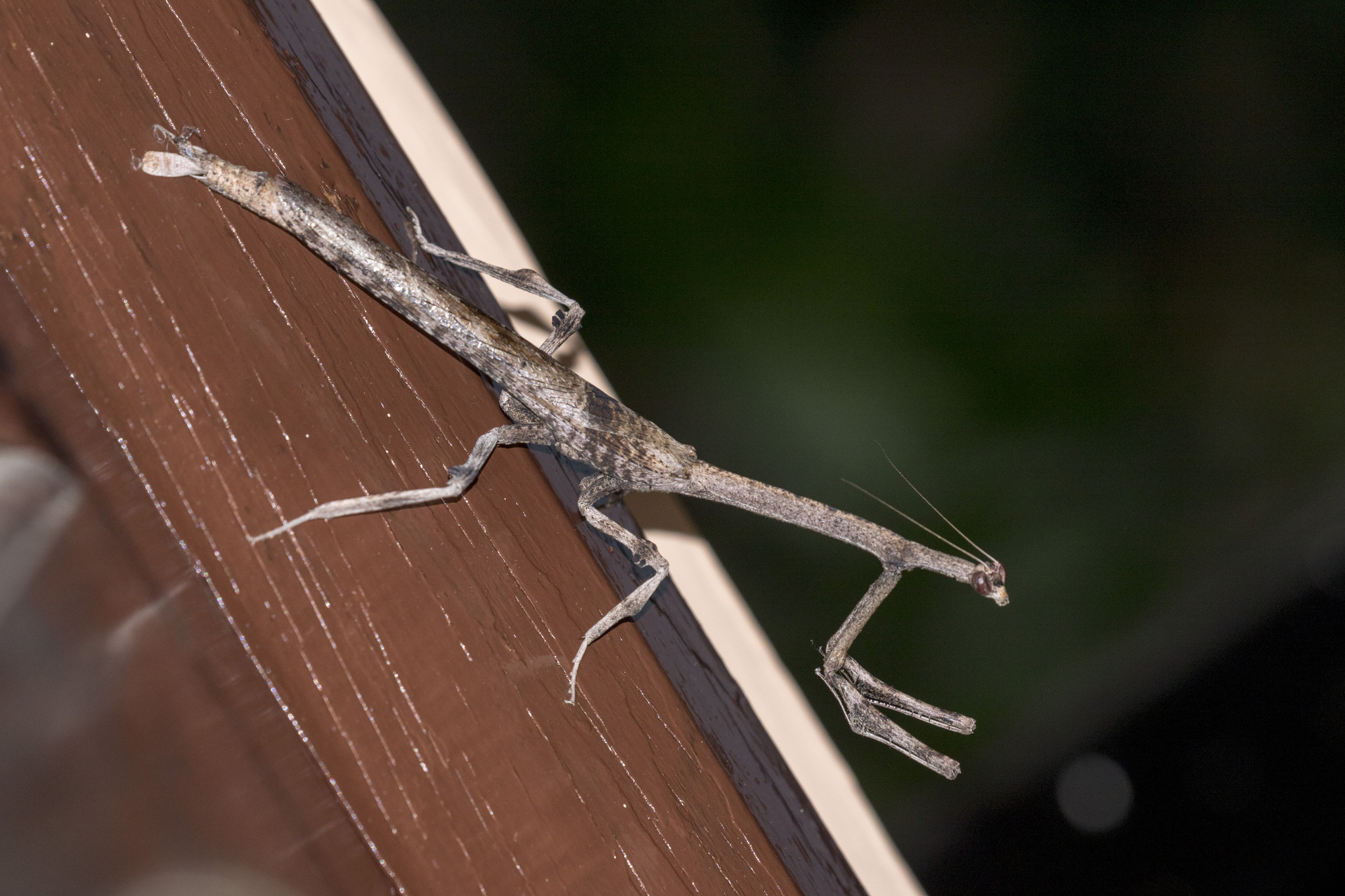
- Aethalochroa ashmoliana in Chhattisgarh, India

Scientific classification
- Kingdom: Animalia
- Phylum: Arthropoda
- Clade: Pancrustacea
- Class: Insecta
- Order: Mantodea
- Family: Toxoderidae
- Tribe: Aethalochroini
- Genus: Aethalochroa; Wood-Mason, 1877

Species
- See text

Synonyms
- Arsacia Stal, 1877; Arsaria Brunner, 1893; Arteria Kirby, 1904; Loxomantis Giglio-Tos, 1914; Oestomantis Giglio-Tos, 1914

= Aethalochroa =

Genus of praying mantises

Aethalochroa is a genus of praying mantis in the family Toxoderidae. It occurs in South and Southeast Asia.

== Species ==
There are six recognized species listed in secondary sources:

- Aethalochroa affinis Wood-Mason, 1889
- Aethalochroa ashmoliana (Westwood, 1842) (Iranian stick mantis)
- Aethalochroa indica Giglio-Tos, 1914
- Aethalochroa insignis Wood-Mason, 1878 (Indian stick mantis)
- Aethalochroa simplicipes Wood-Mason, 1878
- Aethalochroa spinipes Wood-Mason, 1889

The revision by Schwarz and Unnahachote (2025) recognizes the following taxa within Aethalochroa, including Oestomantis as a subgenus rather than a distinct genus:

Subgenus Aethalochroa Wood-Mason, 1877

- Aethalochroa affinis Wood-Mason, 1889
- Aethalochroa afghana Anisyutkin, 2008
- Aethalochroa ashmoliana (Westwood, 1842)
- Aethalochroa insignis Wood-Mason, 1878
- Aethalochroa kaltenbachi Schwarz & Unnahachote, 2025
- Aethalochroa simplicipes Wood-Mason, 1878
- Aethalochroa spinipes Wood-Mason, 1889

Subgenus Oestomantis Giglio-Tos, 1914

- Aethalochroa bacillaris (Giglio-Tos, 1914)

== See also ==
- List of mantis genera and species
