= Brunneria subaptera =

Scientific classification
- Kingdom: Animalia
- Phylum: Arthropoda
- Clade: Pancrustacea
- Class: Insecta
- Order: Mantodea
- Family: Coptopterygidae
- Genus: Brunneria
- Species: B. subaptera

Binomial name
- Brunneria subaptera Saussure, 1869

Species of praying mantis

Brunneria subaptera, common name small-winged stick mantis, is a species of praying mantis found in Argentina, Bolivia, Brazil, Paraguay, Uruguay, and Venezuela.

They are a stick winged mantis found in grasslands of South America.

Mantis reproduction is often associated with sexual cannibalism, where the recently inseminated female eats her mate. These mantises avoid that, using a breeding process called thelytokous parthenogenesis where offspring results from an unfertilized egg. There is a concern among entomologists that the mantises reproducing in this manner will create an extremely limited gene pool.

== See also ==
- List of mantis genera and species
