= Belomantis =

Scientific classification
- Kingdom: Animalia
- Phylum: Arthropoda
- Clade: Pancrustacea
- Class: Insecta
- Order: Mantodea
- Family: Toxoderidae
- Tribe: Calamothespini
- Genus: Belomantis; Giglio-Tos, 1914

Genus of praying mantises

Belomantis is a genus of mantis in the family Toxoderidae. It contains the following three species:

- Belomantis helenae
- Belomantis mirei
- Belomantis occidentalis

== See also ==
- List of mantis genera and species
