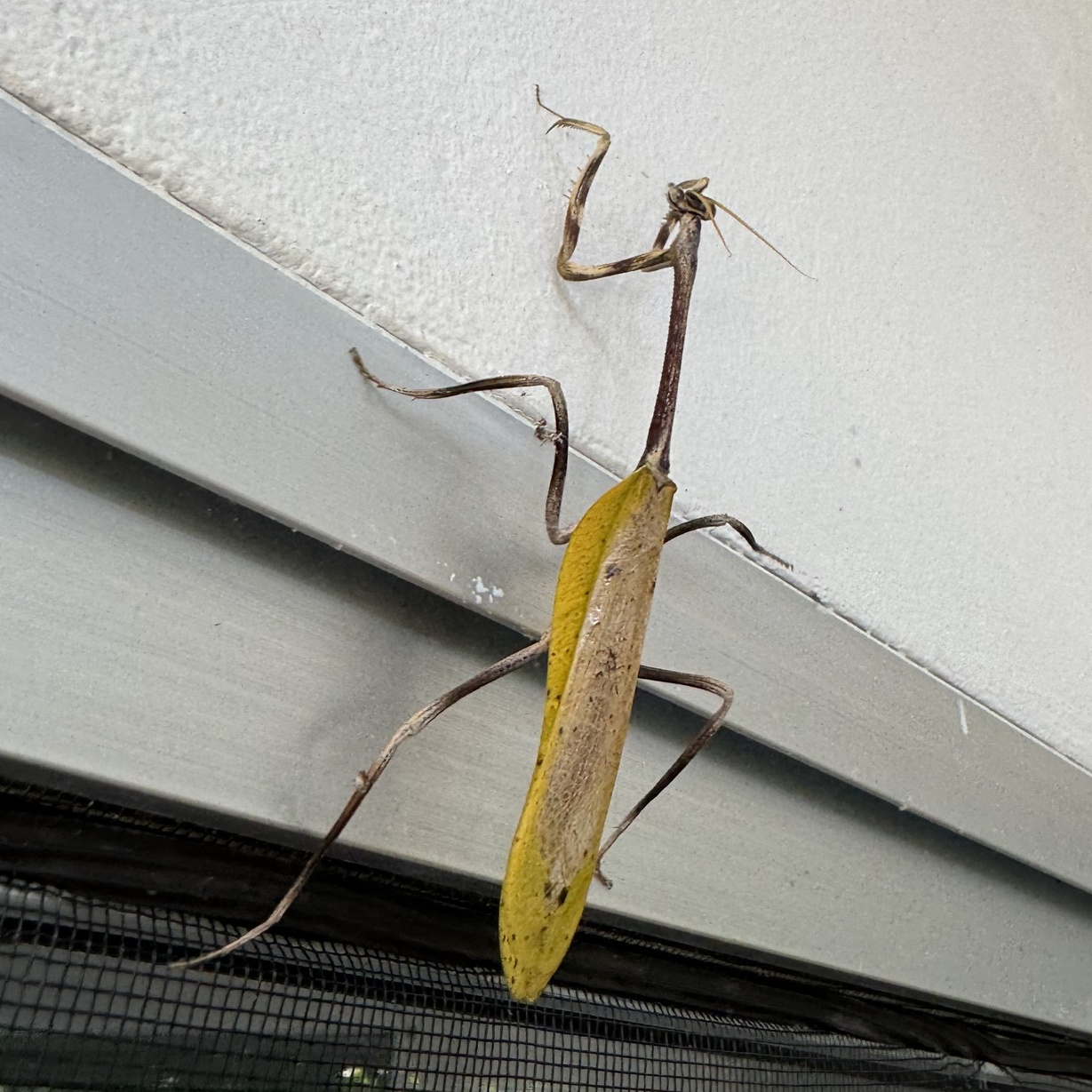
- Adult male

Scientific classification
- Kingdom: Animalia
- Phylum: Arthropoda
- Class: Insecta
- Order: Mantodea
- Family: Mantidae
- Genus: Pseudovates
- Species: P. brevicornis

Binomial name
- Pseudovates brevicornis Stal, 1877

Synonyms
- Phyllovates brevicornis (Stal, 1877)

= Pseudovates brevicornis =

Species of insect

Pseudovates brevicornis is a species of mantis in the family Mantidae. It is found mainly in Ecuador, Colombia, and Costa Rica.
