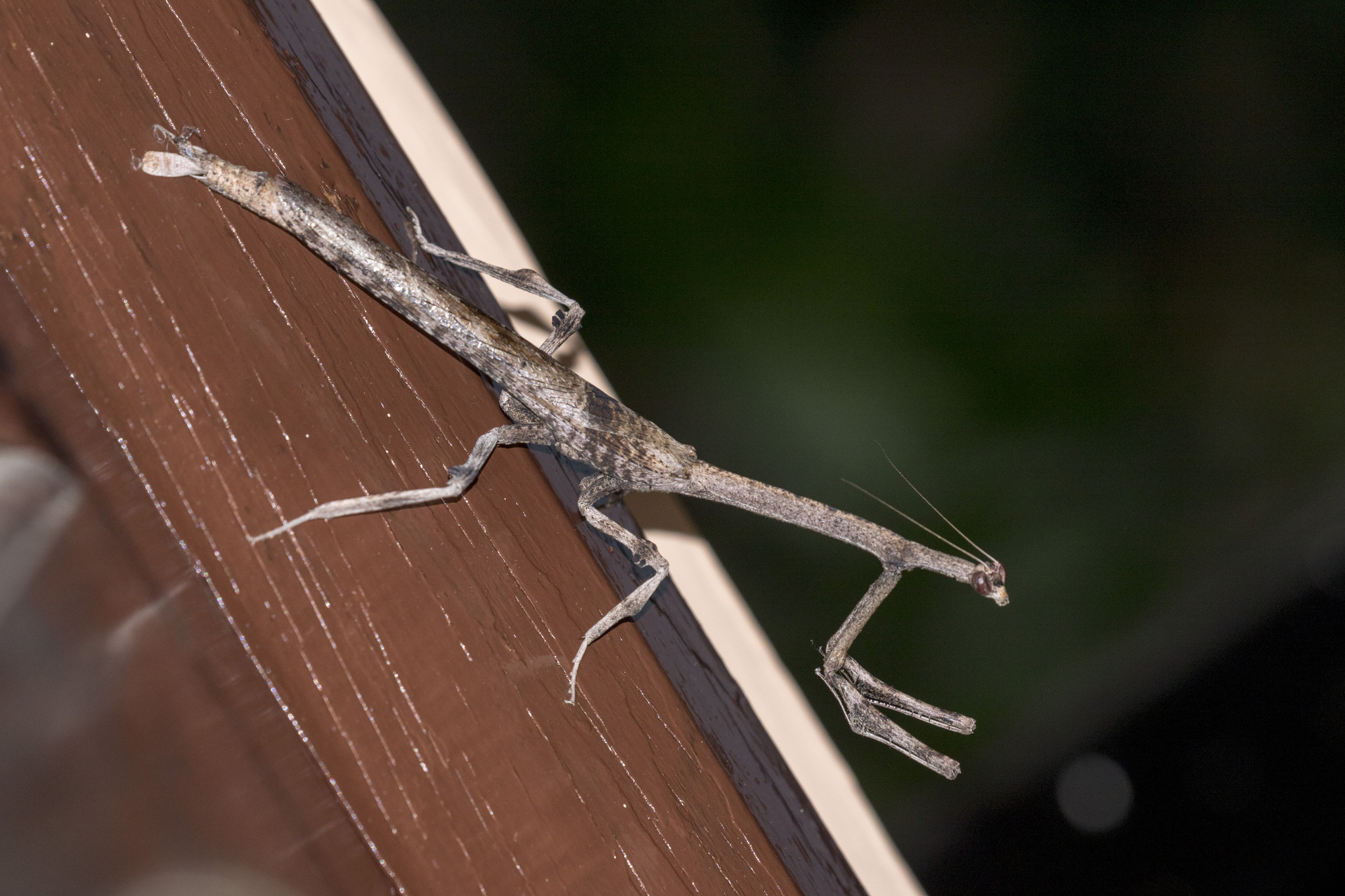
- Aethalochroa ashmoliana in Chhattisgarh, India

Scientific classification
- Kingdom: Animalia
- Phylum: Arthropoda
- Clade: Pancrustacea
- Class: Insecta
- Order: Mantodea
- Family: Toxoderidae
- Genus: Aethalochroa
- Species: A. ashmoliana

Binomial name
- Aethalochroa ashmoliana (Westwood, 1841)

= Aethalochroa ashmoliana =

Species of praying mantis

Aethalochroa ashmoliana, common name Iranian stick mantis, is a species of praying mantis found in India, Iran, Pakistan, and Sri Lanka.

== See also ==
- List of mantis genera and species
- Stick Mantis
