= Calamothespis =

Scientific classification
- Kingdom: Animalia
- Phylum: Arthropoda
- Clade: Pancrustacea
- Class: Insecta
- Order: Mantodea
- Family: Toxoderidae
- Tribe: Calamothespini
- Genus: Calamothespis; Werner, 1907

Synonyms
- Dorymantis Giglio-Tos, 1914

Genus of praying mantises

Calamothespis is a genus of praying mantis in the family Toxoderidae. It contains the following species:

- Calamothespis adusta
- Calamothespis aspoeckorum
- Calamothespis condamini
- Calamothespis congica
- Calamothespis guineensis
- Calamothespis kibweziana
- Calamothespis lesnei
- Calamothespis lineatipennis
- Calamothespis nathani
- Calamothespis oxyops
- Calamothespis prosti
- Calamothespis rourei
- Calamothespis subcornuta
- Calamothespis tanzaniensis
- Calamothespis taylori
- Calamothespis vansoni
- Calamothespis vuattouxi

== See also ==
- List of mantis genera and species
