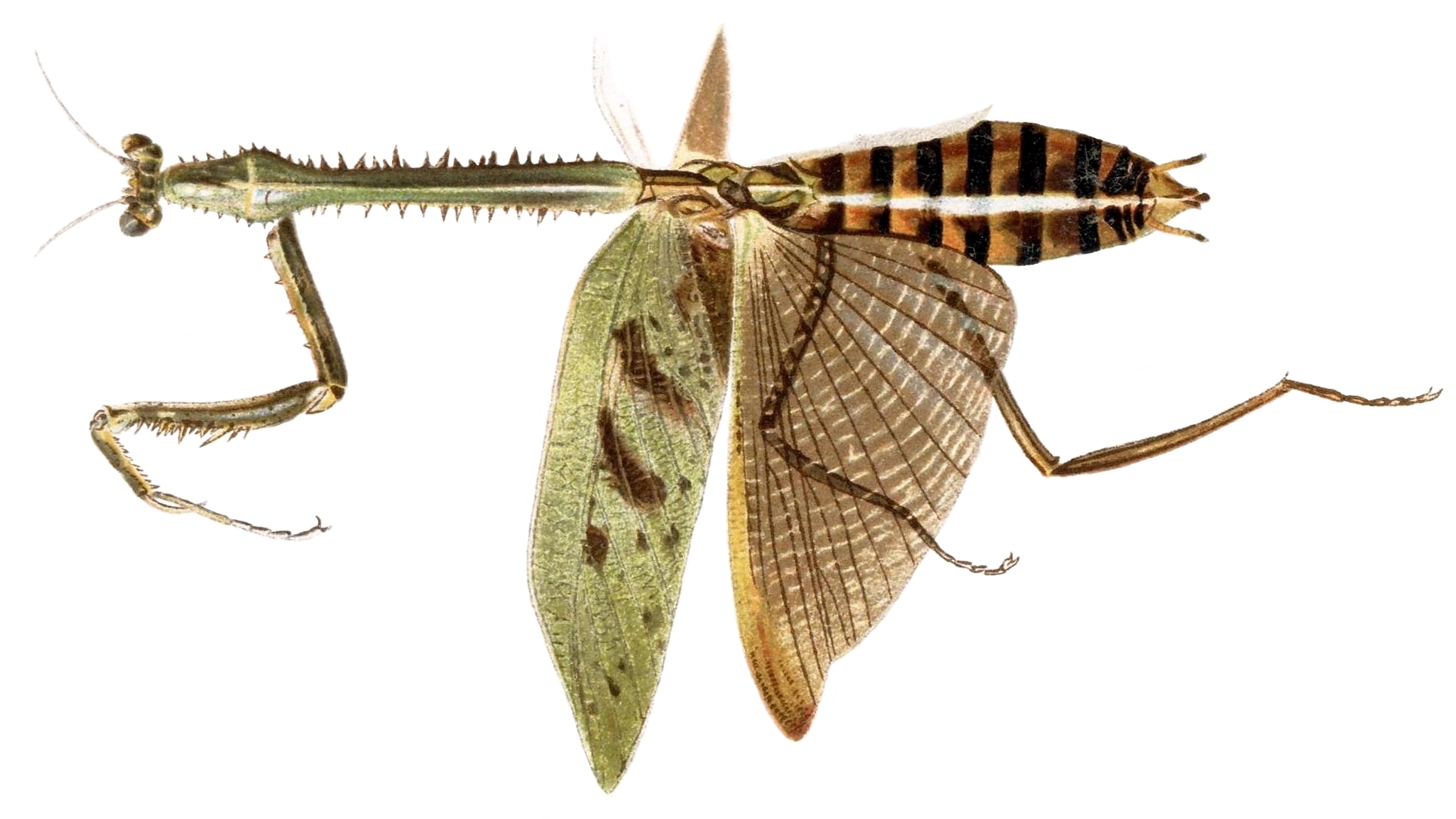
- An illustration of P. spinicollis

Scientific classification
- Kingdom: Animalia
- Phylum: Arthropoda
- Class: Insecta
- Order: Mantodea
- Family: Mantidae
- Genus: Pseudovates
- Species: P. spinicollis

Binomial name
- Pseudovates spinicollis Saussure & Zehntner, 1894

Synonyms
- Theoclytes spinicollis (Saussure & Zehntner, 1894); Phyllovates spinicollis (Saussure & Zehntner, 1894)

= Pseudovates spinicollis =

Species of insect

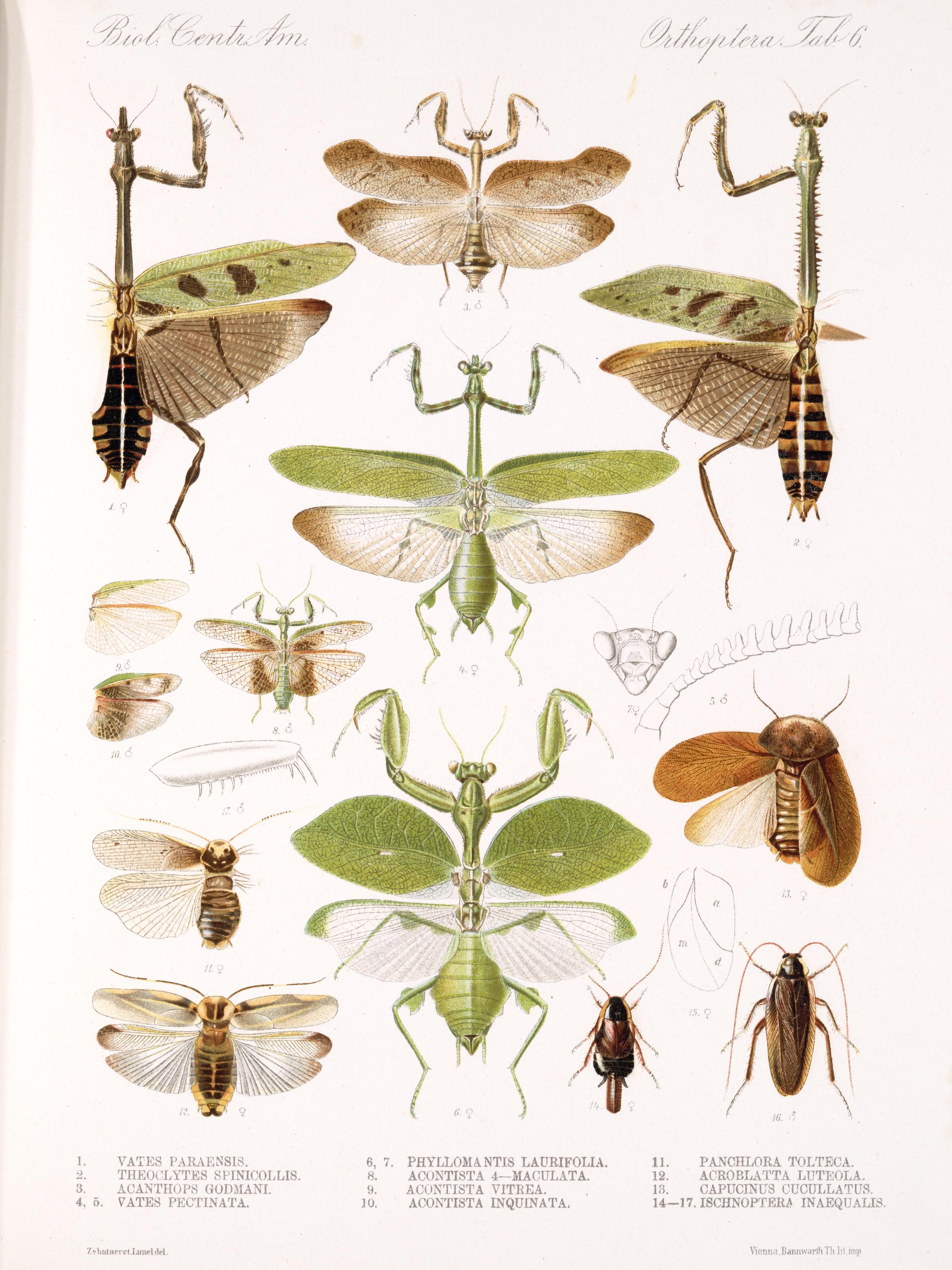
An illustration of Phyllovates spinicollis as seen on a plate by Saussure from Biologia centrali-americana. Insecta. Orthoptera London (upper right corner)

Pseudovates spinicollis is a species of mantis in the family Mantidae. It is found in Brazil.
