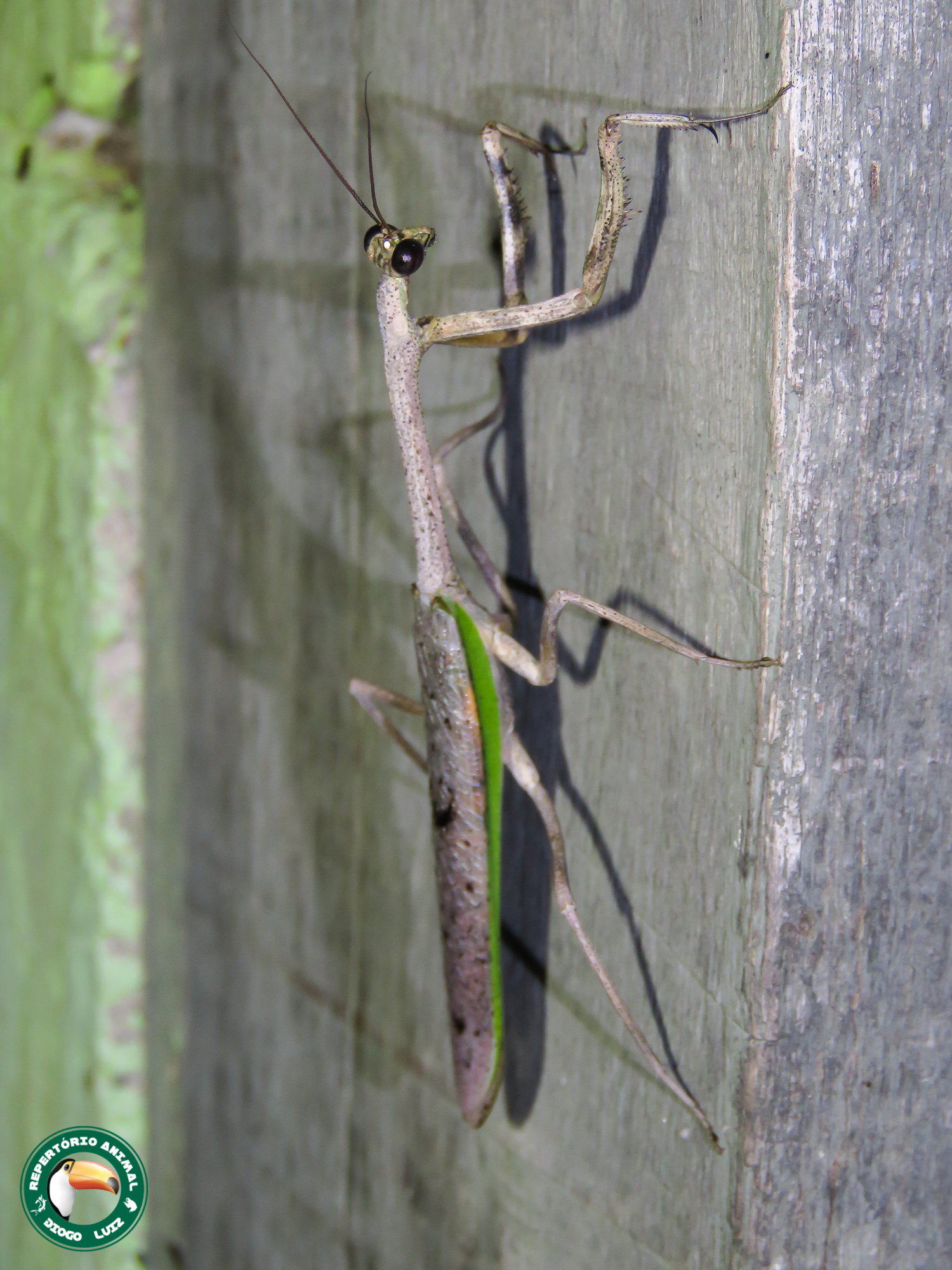
- Pseudovates sp., Brazil

Scientific classification
- Kingdom: Animalia
- Phylum: Arthropoda
- Clade: Pancrustacea
- Class: Insecta
- Order: Mantodea
- Family: Mantidae
- Subfamily: Vatinae
- Tribe: Vatini
- Genus: Pseudovates; Saussure, 1869

Synonyms
- Hagiotata Saussure & Zehntner, 1894; Phyllovates Kirby, 1904

= Pseudovates =

Genus of praying mantises

Pseudovates is a genus of praying mantis in the family Mantidae. There are more than 20 described species in the genus Pseudovates, and are found in North, Central, and South America.

== Species ==
These 22 species belong to the genus Pseudovates:

- Pseudovates arizonae Hebard, 1935 (Arizona Unicorn Mantis)
- Pseudovates bidens Fabricius, 1775
- Pseudovates brasiliensis Toledo Piza, 1982
- Pseudovates brevicollis (Orofino, Ippolito & Lombardo, 2006)
- Pseudovates brevicornis Stal, 1877
- Pseudovates chlorophaea Blanchard, 1836 (Texas Unicorn Mantis)
- Pseudovates cingulata Drury, 1773
- Pseudovates cornuta Saussure & Zehntner, 1894
- Pseudovates denticulata Saussure, 1870
- Pseudovates gracilicollis (Orofino, Ippolito & Lombardo, 2006)
- Pseudovates hofmanni Saussure & Zehntner, 1894
- Pseudovates iheringi Saussure & Zehntner, 1894
- Pseudovates longicollis Stal, 1877
- Pseudovates maya Saussure & Zehntner, 1894
- Pseudovates minor Saussure, 1872
- Pseudovates paraensis Saussure, 1871
- Pseudovates parallela de Haan, 1842
- Pseudovates parvula Westwood, 1889
- Pseudovates peruviana Rehn, 1911 (Peruvian Stick Mantis)
- Pseudovates spinicollis Saussure & Zehntner, 1894
- Pseudovates stolli (Saussure & Zehntner, 1894)
- Pseudovates tolteca Saussure, 1859
- Pseudovates townsendi Rehn, 1904
- Pseudovates tripunctata Burmeister, 1838

== Taxonomy ==
The genus Pseudovates was formerly part of three separate genera. (Phyllovates, Pseudovates, and Hagiotata). A recent taxonomic revision synonomized them and are now classified under the genus Pseudovates.

== Additional Images ==
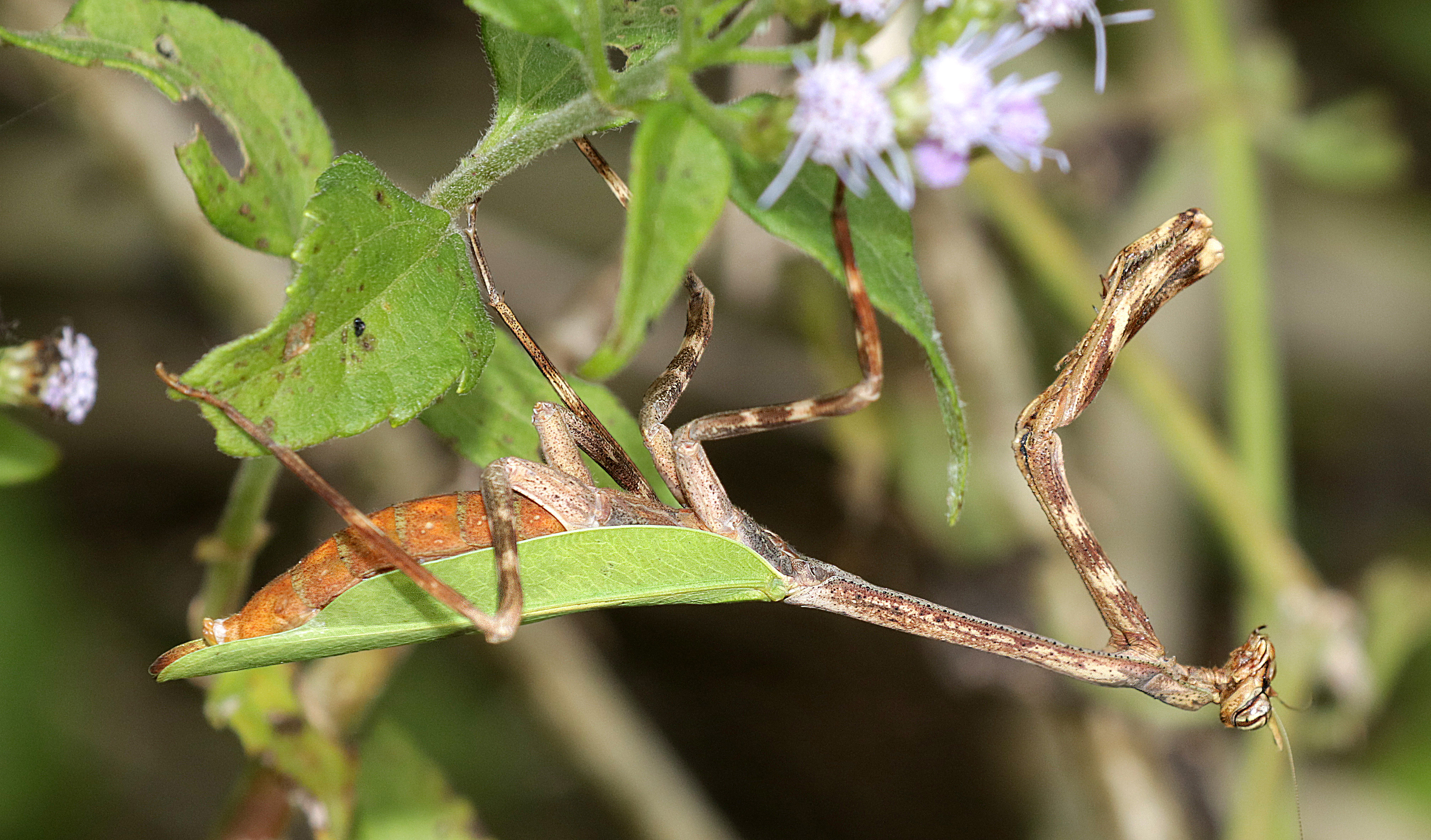
The Texas Unicorn Mantis (Pseudovates chlorophaea)

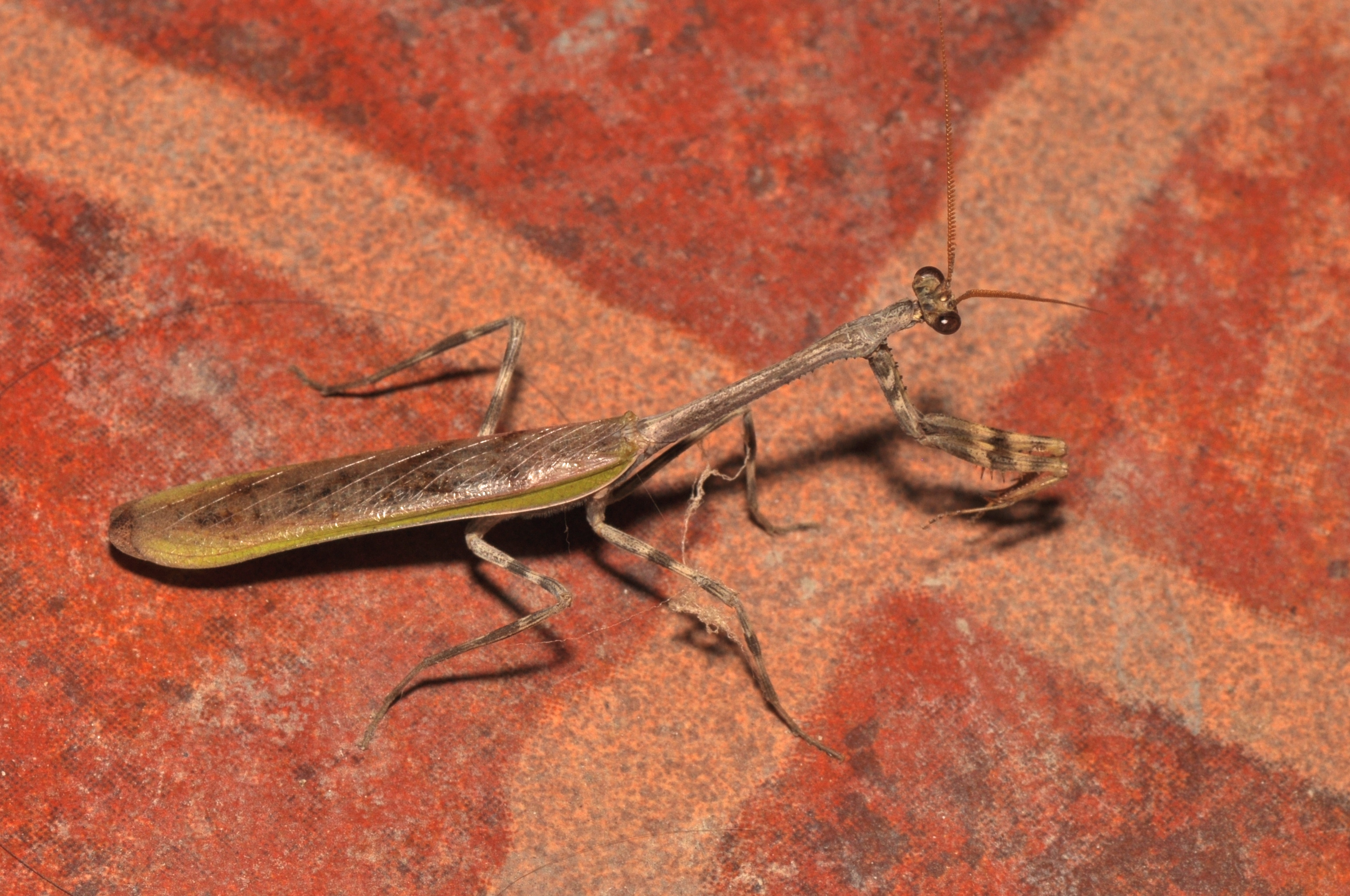
Pseudovates adult male

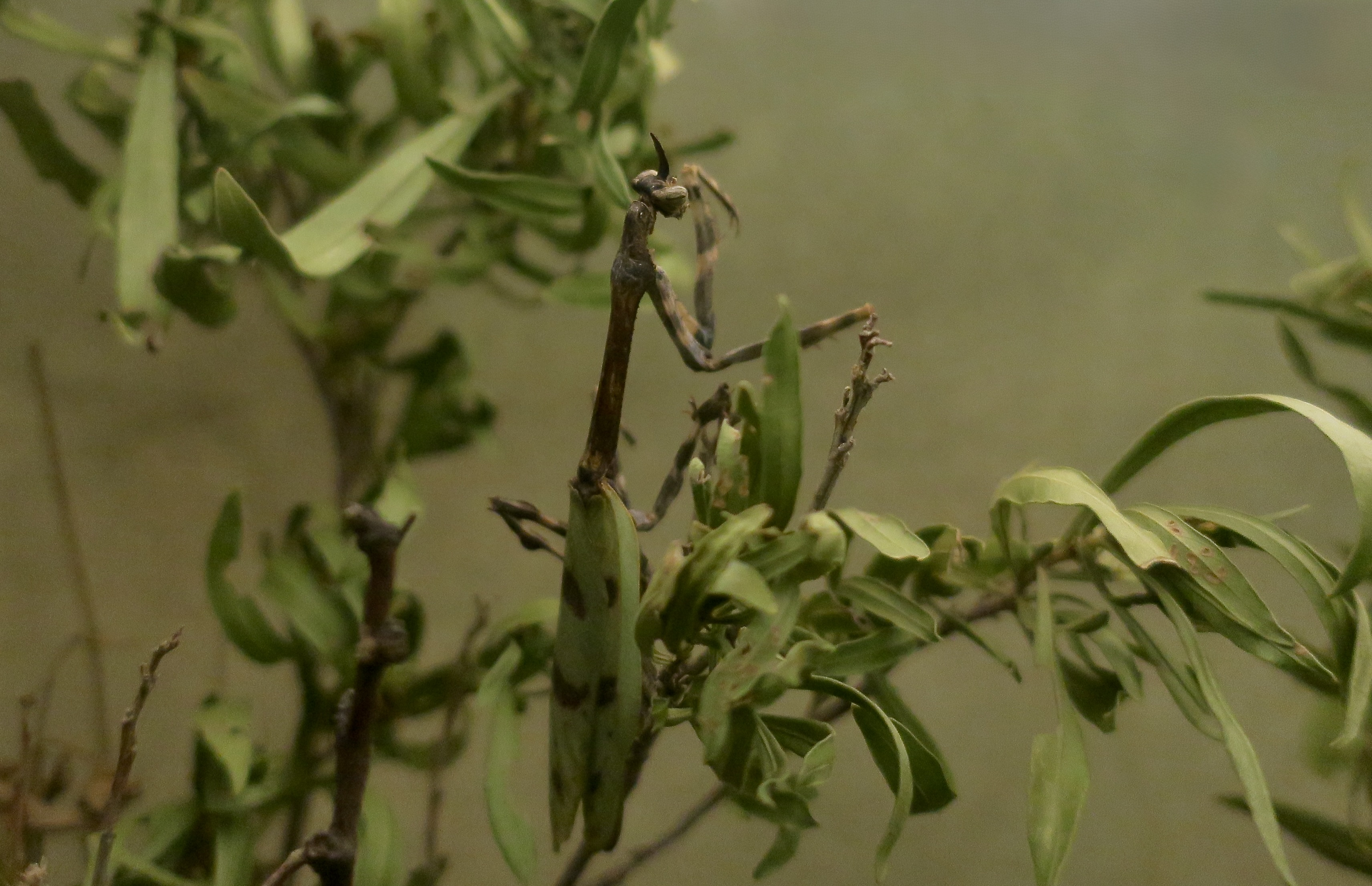
The Arizona Unicorn Mantis (Pseudovates arizonae)

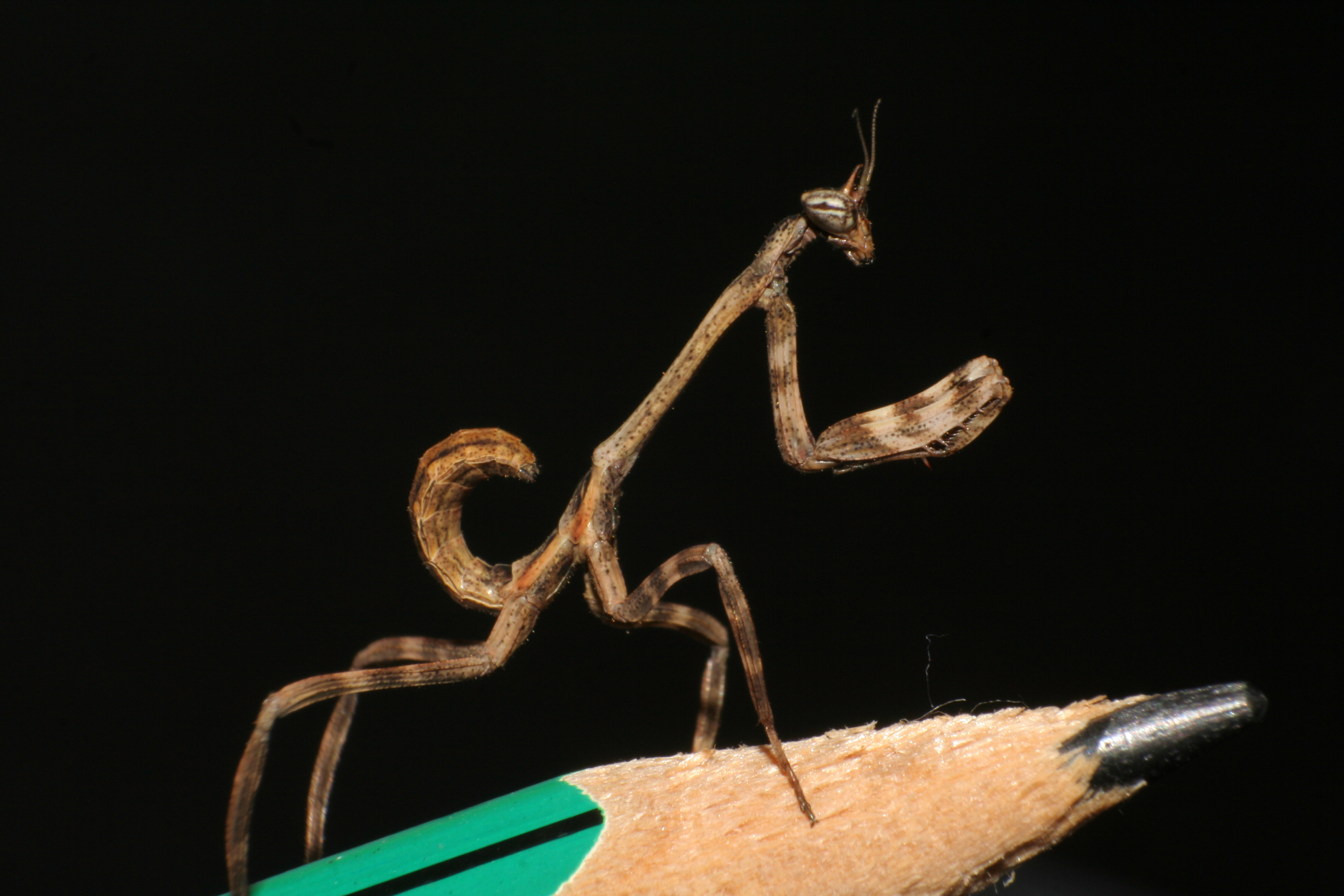
A nymph of the Texas Unicorn Mantis

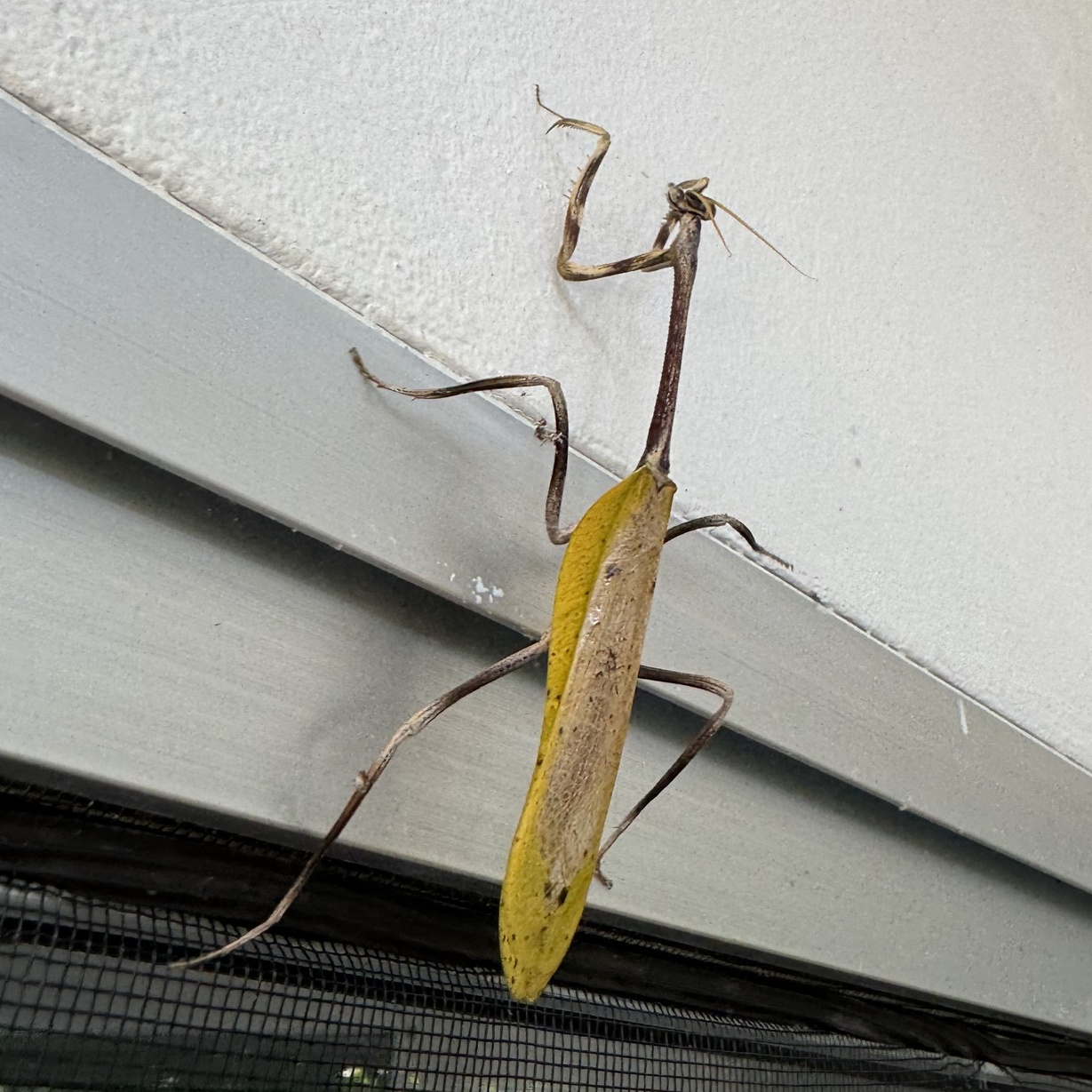
Pseudovates brevicornis adult male
