= Brunneria brasiliensis =

Scientific classification
- Kingdom: Animalia
- Phylum: Arthropoda
- Clade: Pancrustacea
- Class: Insecta
- Order: Mantodea
- Family: Coptopterygidae
- Genus: Brunneria
- Species: B. brasiliensis

Binomial name
- Brunneria brasiliensis Saussure, 1870

Species of praying mantis

Brunneria brasiliensis, common name Brazilian stick mantis, is a species of praying mantis found in Argentina, Brazil, and Paraguay.

== See also ==
- List of mantis genera and species
