= Oxyothespis tricolor =

Scientific classification
- Domain: Eukaryota
- Kingdom: Animalia
- Phylum: Arthropoda
- Class: Insecta
- Order: Mantodea
- Family: Toxoderidae
- Genus: Oxyothespis
- Species: O. tricolor

Binomial name
- Oxyothespis tricolor Chopard, 1941

Species of praying mantis

Oxyothespis tricolor is a species of praying mantis in the family Toxoderidae.

== See also ==
- List of mantis genera and species
