= Pseudovates peruviana =

Peruvian stick mantis

Scientific classification
- Kingdom: Animalia
- Phylum: Arthropoda
- Clade: Pancrustacea
- Class: Insecta
- Order: Mantodea
- Family: Mantidae
- Genus: Pseudovates
- Species: P. peruviana

Binomial name
- Pseudovates peruviana Rehn, 1911

Species of praying mantis

Pseudovates peruviana, common name Peruvian stick mantis, is a medium-sized species of praying mantis endemic to Peru.

It takes its name from its slender, twig-like body, often dark brown in coloration, with two dark markings on its wings. Females can also have green forewings, mottled to mimic dying leaves."

This species, like many other mantids, can be kept as a pet.

== See also ==
- Stick mantis
- List of mantis genera and species
