= Toxodera =

- Toxodera denticulata

Scientific classification
- Kingdom: Animalia
- Phylum: Arthropoda
- Clade: Pancrustacea
- Class: Insecta
- Order: Mantodea
- Family: Toxoderidae
- Subfamily: Toxoderinae
- Tribe: Toxoderini
- Genus: Toxodera; Serville, 1837

Genus of praying mantises

Toxodera is the type genus of mantises in the family Toxoderidae, known for their stick mimicry. There are four confirmed species in Borneo restricted to old-growth forests, and are considered to be rare. Species of the South-East Asian Toxoderini inhabit beneath the forest canopy. Not much is known regarding their ecology. Males however, are often attracted to lights. One species, Toxodera maxima, can reach 18 cm in total length.

== Species ==
The Mantodea Species File lists:

- Toxodera beieri Roy, 2009 (Dragon mantis)
- Toxodera denticulata Serville, 1837 (slender flower mantis, synonym T. gigas Ouwens, 1913) - type species
- Toxodera fimbriata Werner, 1930 (feathered mantis, Feather mantis)
- Toxodera hauseri Roy, 2009
- Toxodera integrifolia Werner, 1925
- Toxodera maculata Beier, 1913
- Toxodera maxima Roy, 2009
- Toxodera pfanneri Roy, 2009

In addition, Toxodera novopensis was described from Mindanao, Philippines, by Kris Anderson in 2024.
