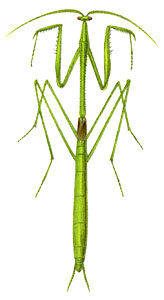

Scientific classification
- Kingdom: Animalia
- Phylum: Arthropoda
- Clade: Pancrustacea
- Class: Insecta
- Order: Mantodea
- Family: Coptopterygidae
- Genus: Brunneria
- Species: B. borealis

Binomial name
- Brunneria borealis Scudder, 1896

= Brunneria borealis =

Species of praying mantis

Brunneria borealis, common name Brunner's mantis, Brunner's stick mantis, or northern grass mantis, is a species of praying mantis native to the southern United States. It is the only mantis species known to reproduce solely through parthenogenesis; there are no males.

== Description ==
Brunneria borealis is an elongated green insect with the typical raptorial forelimbs of a mantis. The adults have reduced-size wings and are probably unable to fly. They can grow to a length of about 77 mm (3 in).

== Distribution and habitat ==
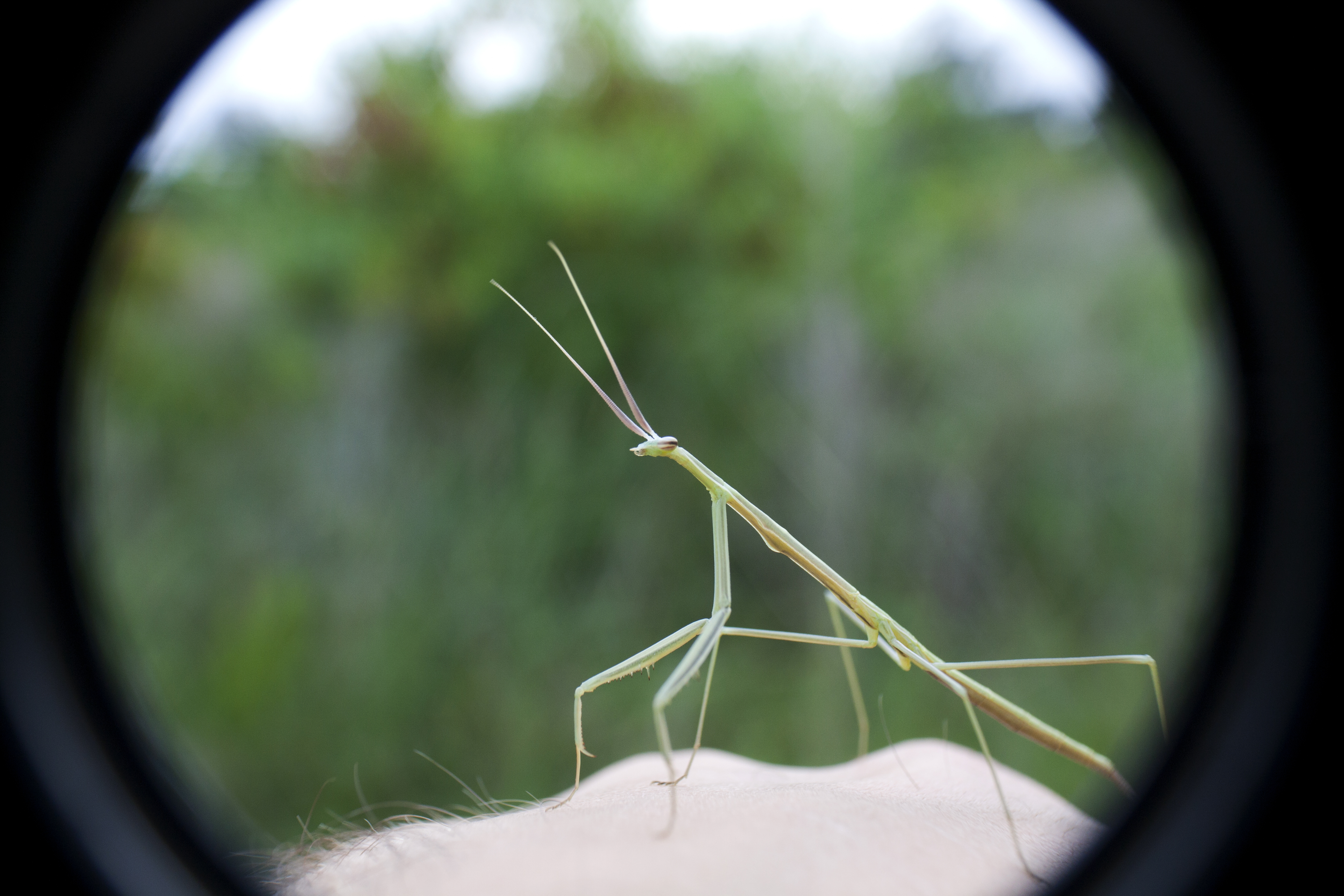
Brunneria borealis from S.E. Texas

B. borealis is native to the southern United States, from the Atlantic Ocean as far west as Texas where it occurs in Bell County, Brazos County, Comanche County, Erath County, Montgomery County, Tarrant County, and Parker County probably as separate local populations. It has been recorded in North Carolina, South Carolina, Georgia, Florida, Alabama, Louisiana, Mississippi, Arkansas, Oklahoma and Texas. At Austin, Texas it was found on flowerheads of the slender aster (Symphyotrichum subulatum. At Cedar Creek, Texas it was found in meadows of little bluestem grass (Schizachyrium scoparium) at night but was unnoticeable by day.

== Biology ==
This mantis does not breed sexually and the adults, which are all female, lay their eggs without the involvement of a male. The clutch of eggs is protected by an ootheca or egg-case. In most mantis species, each mantis nymph emerges from its own hole in the egg-case, but in this species, one of the ootheca is drawn out into a point and all the nymphs emerge through this. The nymphs are similar to the adults in appearance and go through a series of moults as they grow.

Mantises are generally ambush predators, but little is known about the diet of this mantis. It can be found at night about a foot off the ground, climbing higher among the grasses if disturbed. Judging by its size, it most likely feeds on grasshoppers. This species also enjoys eating grass dwelling phasmatodea, which are often slender instead of robust and have few defenses against the mantises. When disturbed, it will sway or stiffen much like a stick insect.

== See also ==
- List of mantis genera and species
