= Onchidium tricolor =

Scientific classification
- Kingdom: Animalia
- Phylum: Mollusca
- Class: Gastropoda
- Order: Systellommatophora
- Family: Onchidiidae
- Genus: Onchidium
- Species: O. tricolor

Binomial name
- Onchidium tricolor (Simroth, 1918)

Synonyms
- Oncidium tricolor Simroth, 1918

Species of gastropod

Onchidium tricolor is a species of air-breathing sea slug, a shell-less marine pulmonate gastropod mollusk in the family Onchidiidae.
