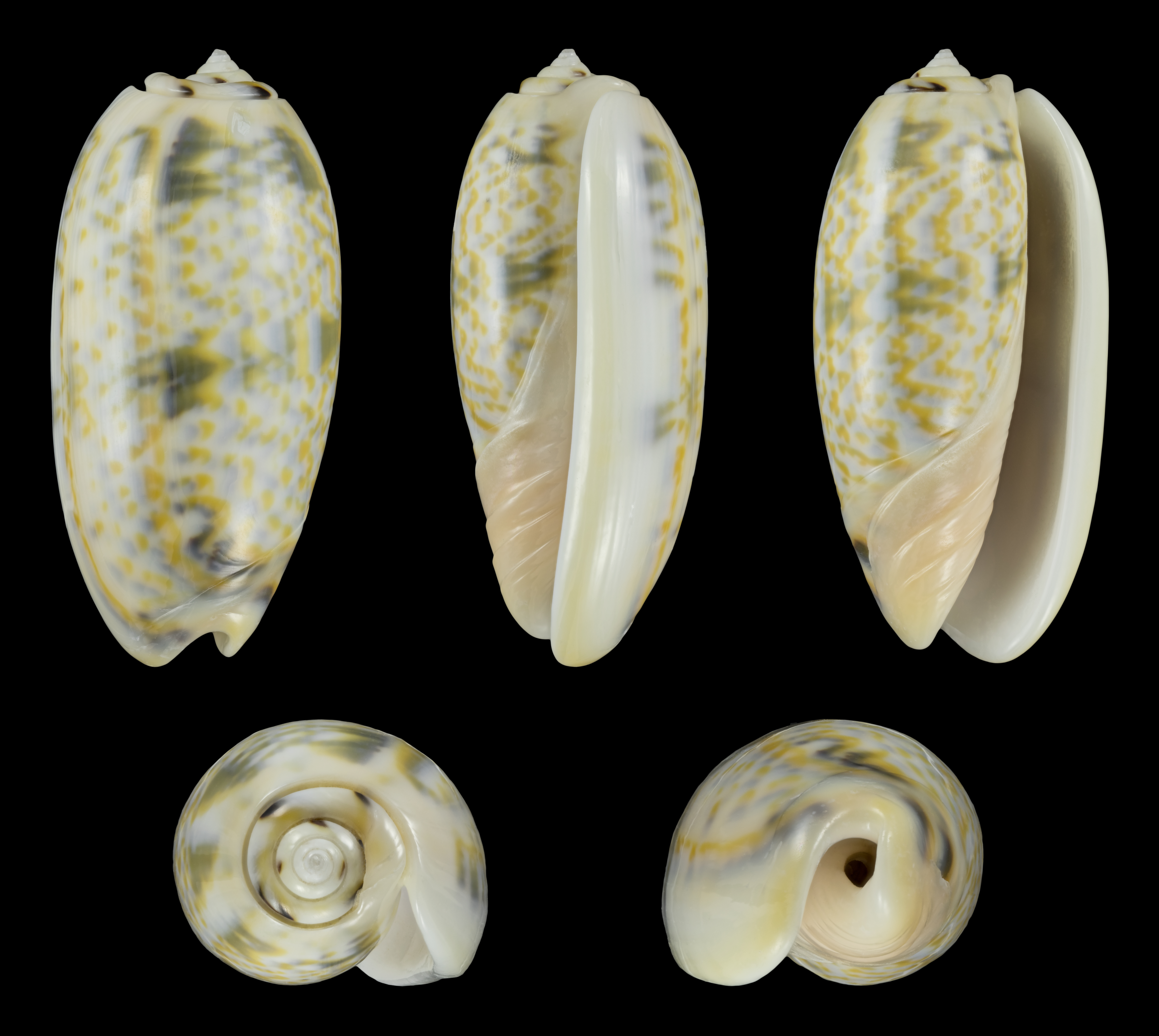

Scientific classification
- Kingdom: Animalia
- Phylum: Mollusca
- Class: Gastropoda
- Subclass: Caenogastropoda
- Order: Neogastropoda
- Family: Olividae
- Genus: Oliva
- Species: O. tricolor

Binomial name
- Oliva tricolor Lamarck, 1811

Synonyms
- Oliva (Oliva) guttula Marrat, F.P., 1871; Oliva (Oliva) tringa Duclos, P.L., 1840; Oliva (Viduoliva) tricolor Lamarck, 1811; Oliva philantha Duclos, 1840; Oliva tringa Duclos, 1835; Viduoliva tricolor (Lamarck, 1811)

= Oliva tricolor =

Species of mollusc

Oliva tricolor, common name the tricolour olive, is a species of sea snail, a marine gastropod mollusk in the family Olividae, the olives.

Subspecies

- Oliva tricolor abbasi (Thach & Berschauer, 2016) (synonym: Viduoliva tricolor abbasi Thach & Berschauer, 2016)
- Oliva tricolor tricolor Lamarck, 1811
- Oliva tricolor palawanensis Bartsch, 1918 (taxon inquirendum)

== Description ==
The length of the shell is between 38 mm and 63 mm.

== Distribution ==
Oliva tricolor is endemic to the Indian Ocean, the West Pacific and the South China Sea.
