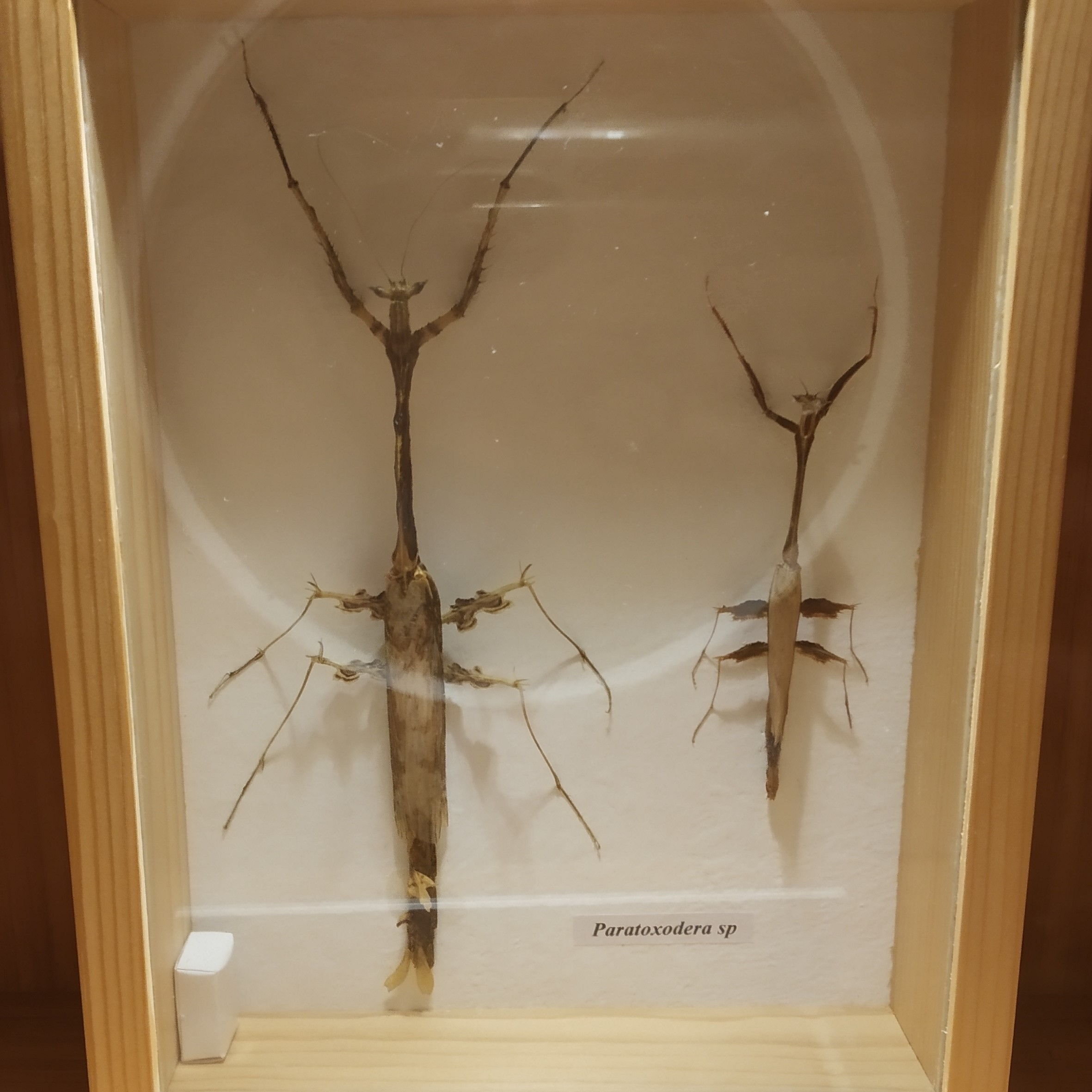
- Paratoxodera sp.

Scientific classification
- Kingdom: Animalia
- Phylum: Arthropoda
- Clade: Pancrustacea
- Class: Insecta
- Order: Mantodea
- Family: Toxoderidae
- Tribe: Toxoderini
- Genus: Paratoxodera; Wood-Mason, 1889

= Paratoxodera =

Genus of praying mantises

Paratoxodera is a genus of praying mantis in the family Toxoderidae and tribe Toxoderini; species are recorded from Indo-China and Malesia.

== Species ==
The Mantodea Species File lists:

- Paratoxodera borneana Beier, 1931
- Paratoxodera cornicollis Wood-Mason, 1889 (type species)
- Paratoxodera gigliotosi Roy, 2009
- Paratoxodera marshallae Roy, 2009
- Paratoxodera meggitti Uvarov, 1927
- Paratoxodera polyacantha Roy, 2009
