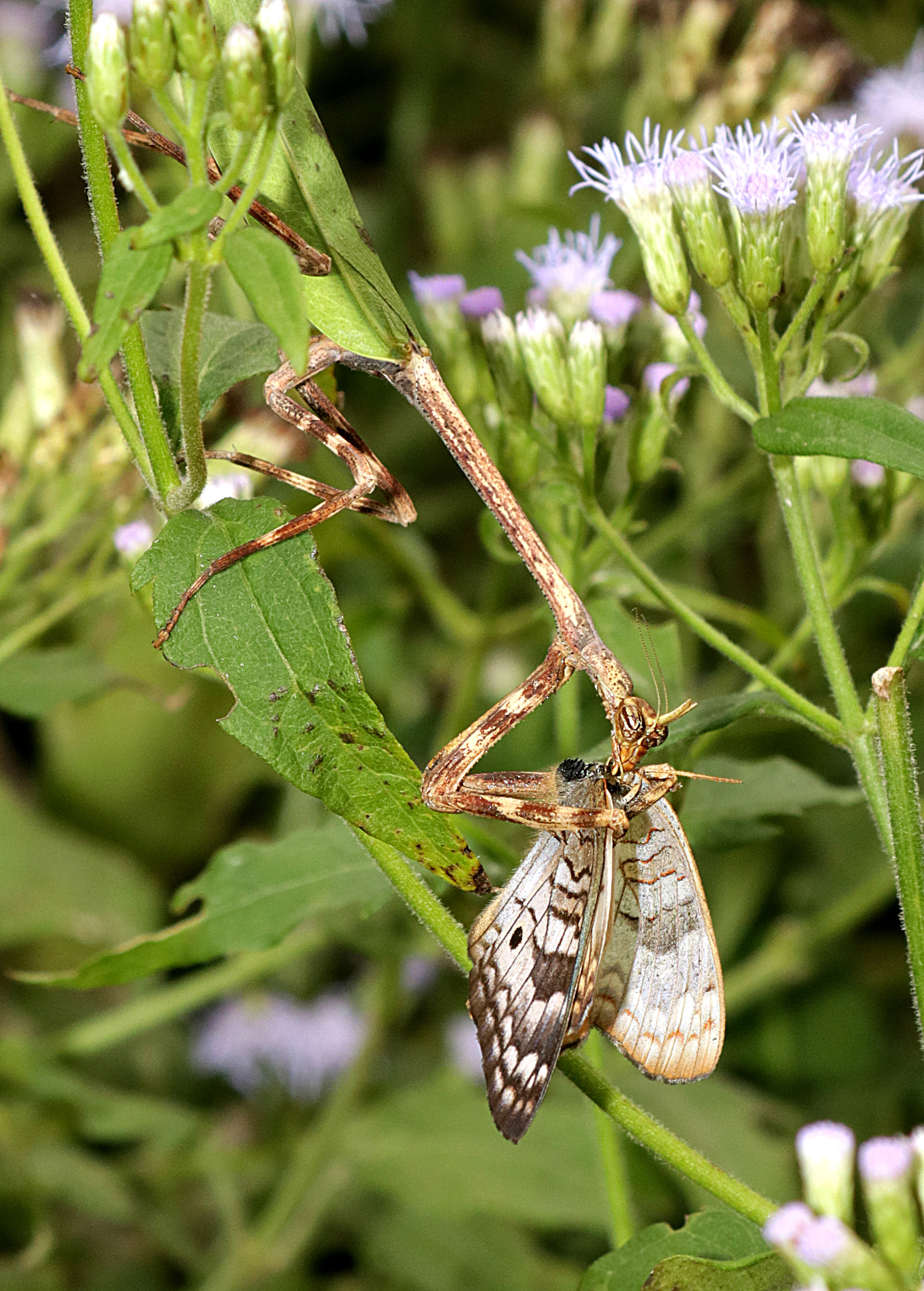

Scientific classification
- Kingdom: Animalia
- Phylum: Arthropoda
- Clade: Pancrustacea
- Class: Insecta
- Order: Mantodea
- Family: Mantidae
- Genus: Pseudovates
- Species: P. chlorophaea

Binomial name
- Pseudovates chlorophaea Blanchard, 1836

Synonyms
- Phyllovates chlorophaea (Blanchard, 1836); Pseudovates azteca Kirby, 1904

= Pseudovates chlorophaea =

Species of praying mantis

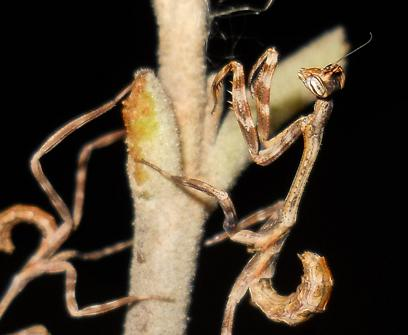
Phyllovates chlorophaea nymphs

Pseudovates chlorophaea, with the common name Texas unicorn mantis, is a species of praying mantis in the family Mantidae. It is native to the southern United States, Mexico, Central America, and northern South America.

== Background ==
Specimens in the United States are presently only known from southernmost Texas. The Florida record from Blatchley, 1920 is the only known record and has never been substantiated.

Nymphs are brown-striped and arise from small, globular oothecae that are reddish brown in color. The horn on the head is formed of two pieces and is very small in the early instars, similar in appearance to two knobs in the first instar. As specimens grow, they overlap and appear to be a single large, horn though they are not fused. The adults are not as cryptic and have bright green wings with dark brown splotches. Females form four to ten oothecae, usually on thin branches. These hatch in approximately six weeks and contain thirty to fifty eggs per ootheca. There is no ootheca diapause.

== See also ==
- List of mantis genera and species
