= Grass mantis =

Common name for several praying mantises

Grass mantis is a common name mostly given to various species of praying mantis that mimic grass or other slender vegetation. Species to which this name has been applied include but are not limited to:

- Glabromantis mexicana (Mexican grass mantis)
- Odontomantis planiceps (grass mantis)
- Oxyothespis dumonti (African grass mantis)
- Thesprotia graminis (American grass mantis)
- Schizocephala bicornis (Indian grass mantis)

== See also ==
- Dead leaf mantis
- Flower mantis
- Stick mantis
- List of mantis genera and species
