= Paratoxodera cornicollis =

Scientific classification
- Kingdom: Animalia
- Phylum: Arthropoda
- Clade: Pancrustacea
- Class: Insecta
- Order: Mantodea
- Family: Toxoderidae
- Subfamily: Toxoderinae
- Tribe: Toxoderini
- Genus: Paratoxodera
- Species: P. cornicollis

Binomial name
- Paratoxodera cornicollis Wood-Mason, 1889

Species of praying mantis

Paratoxodera cornicollis, common name giant Malaysian stick mantis, is a species of praying mantis found in Indonesia (Java).

== See also ==
- List of mantis genera and species
