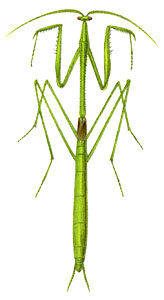
- Brunneria borealis

Scientific classification
- Kingdom: Animalia
- Phylum: Arthropoda
- Clade: Pancrustacea
- Class: Insecta
- Order: Mantodea
- Superfamily: Acanthopoidea
- Family: Coptopterygidae; Giglio-Tos, 1915

= Coptopterygidae =

Family of praying mantises

Coptopterygidae is a family of mantises in the order Mantodea. There are at least 2 genera and more than 20 described species in Coptopterygidae.

== Genera ==
These two genera belong to the family Coptopterygidae:

- Brunneria Saussure, 1869 (Brunner's stick mantis)
- Coptopteryx Saussure, 1869
