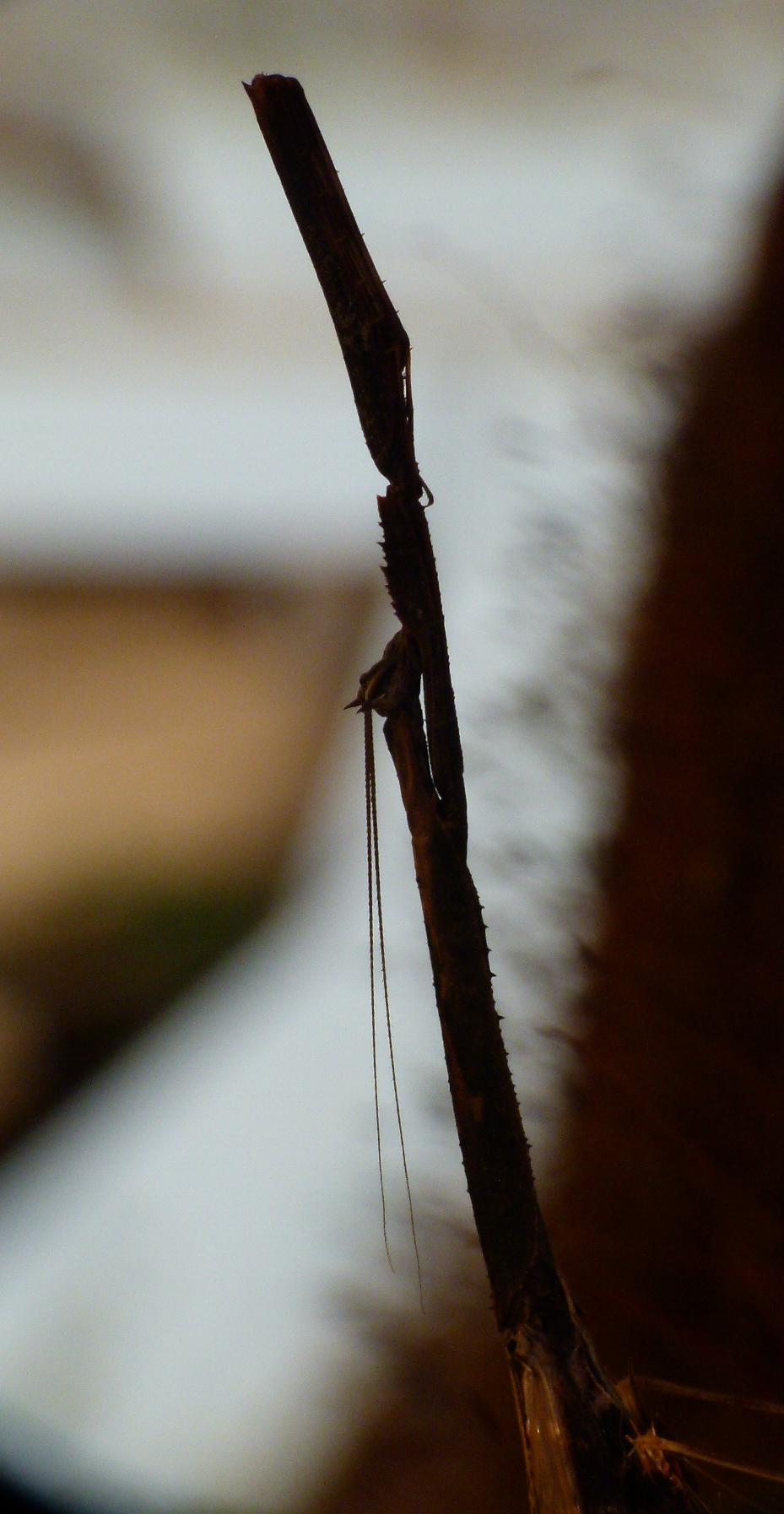

Scientific classification
- Kingdom: Animalia
- Phylum: Arthropoda
- Clade: Pancrustacea
- Class: Insecta
- Order: Mantodea
- Family: Toxoderidae; Giglio-Tos, 1919

Genera
- See text

= Toxoderidae =

Family of praying mantises

Toxoderidae is a family of praying mantises.

== Subordinate taxa ==
The Mantodea Species File lists:

=== Subfamily Compsothespinae ===
- Genus Compsothespis Saussure, 1872

=== Subfamily Heterochaetinae ===
- Genus Heterochaeta Westwood, 1845

=== Subfamily Oxyothespinae ===
Tribe Heterochaetulini

- Genus Heterochaetula Wood-Mason, 1889

Tribe Oxyothespini

- Genus Acithespis Giglio-Tos, 1916
- Genus Lobothespis La Greca & Lombardo, 1987
- Genus Oxyothespis Saussure, 1870
- Genus Paraseverinia Lombardo, 1991
- Genus Severinia Finot, 1902
- Genus Sinaiella Karsch, 1892
- Genus Somalithespis Lombardo, 1991

=== Subfamily Toxoderinae ===
Distribution: includes Africa, Middle-East, Asia

Tribe Aethalochroini

- Genus Aethalochroa Wood-Mason, 1877
- Genus Oestomantis Giglio-Tos, 1914
- Genus Pareuthyphlebs Werner, 1928

Tribe Calamothespini

Distribution: Africa

- Genus Belomantis Giglio-Tos, 1914
- Genus Calamothespis Werner, 1907
- Genus Toxomantis Giglio-Tos, 1914

Tribe Toxoderini

- Genus Metatoxodera Roy, 2009
- Genus Paratoxodera Wood-Mason, 1889
- Genus Protoxodera Roy, 2009
- Genus Stenotoxodera Roy, 2009
- Genus Toxodera Serville, 1837

Tribe Toxoderopsini

- Genus Euthyphleps Wood-Mason, 1889
- Genus Toxodanuria Uvarov, 1940
- Genus Toxoderella Giglio-Tos, 1914
- Genus Toxoderopsis Wood-Mason, 1889

== See also ==
- List of mantis genera and species
