= Miomantis tenuis =

Scientific classification
- Kingdom: Animalia
- Phylum: Arthropoda
- Class: Insecta
- Order: Mantodea
- Family: Miomantidae
- Genus: Miomantis
- Species: M. tenuis

Binomial name
- Miomantis tenuis Giglio-Tos, 1917

Species of praying mantis

Miomantis tenuis is a species of praying mantis in the family Miomantidae, known from East Africa. It has been recorded in Kenya and Tanzania.

== See also ==
- List of mantis genera and species
