= Miomantis abyssinica =

Scientific classification
- Kingdom: Animalia
- Phylum: Arthropoda
- Clade: Pancrustacea
- Class: Insecta
- Order: Mantodea
- Family: Miomantidae
- Genus: Miomantis
- Species: M. abyssinica

Binomial name
- Miomantis abyssinica Giglio-Tos, 1911

Synonyms
- Miomantis lamalis Rehn, 1914

Species of praying mantis

Miomantis abyssinica is a species of praying mantis in the family Miomantidae, native to North Africa.

It is one of several species sometimes known as the Egyptian praying mantis, along with Miomantis paykullii and Miomantis pharaonica.

== Description ==
It lives in hot and dry conditions, including the Sahara desert.

It can range from yellow to light green in color.

Adult mantises are usually 30–40 mm in length, though male mantises can be 5 mm longer, and females are slightly bigger and heavier than the males.

== See also ==
- List of mantis genera and species
