= Miomantis kilimandjarica =

Scientific classification
- Kingdom: Animalia
- Phylum: Arthropoda
- Clade: Pancrustacea
- Class: Insecta
- Order: Mantodea
- Family: Miomantidae
- Genus: Miomantis
- Species: M. kilimandjarica

Binomial name
- Miomantis kilimandjarica Sjostedt, 1909

Synonyms
- Miomantis irrorata Giglio-Tos, 1911

Species of praying mantis

Miomantis kilimandjarica is a species of praying mantis in the family Miomantidae, subfamily Miomantinae, native to East Africa. It is found on Mount Kilimanjaro in Tanzania.

== Taxonomy ==
The species was first described by Swedish naturalist Bror Yngve Sjöstedt in 1909, based on specimens collected during the Swedish Zoological Expedition to Kilimanjaro and Meru (1905–1906), one of the major early scientific surveys of insect diversity in German East Africa. The specific epithet kilimandjarica is a Latinised form of Kilimanjaro, directly referencing the type locality on the mountain. A junior synonym, Miomantis irrorata, was described by Italian entomologist Ermanno Giglio-Tos in 1911. The family Miomantidae was elevated to family status from its former position as a subfamily (Miomantinae within Mantidae) in a 2019 systematic revision by Schwarz and Roy, based on phylogenetic analyses incorporating morphological and molecular data.

== See also ==
- List of mantis genera and species
