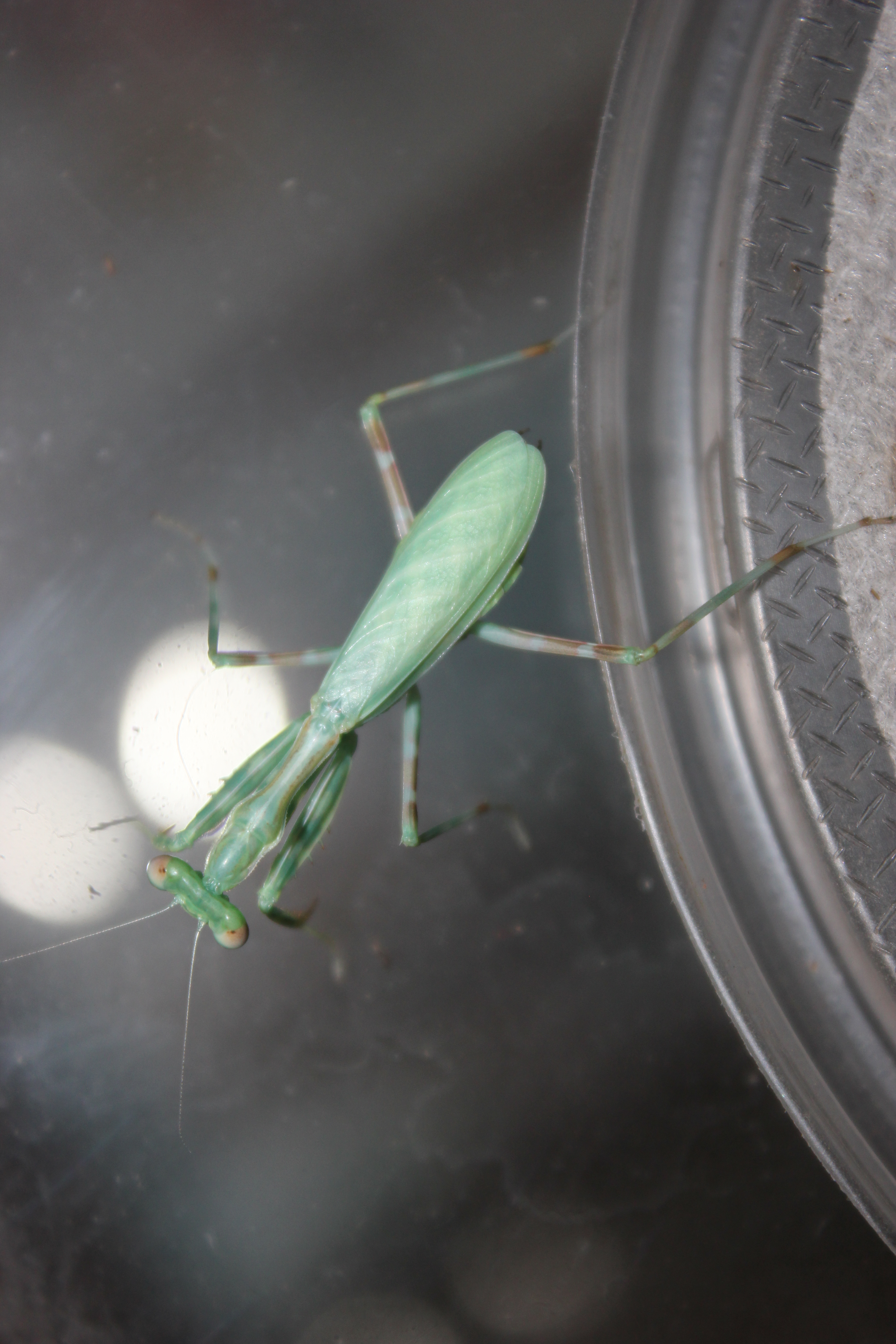
- Adult female
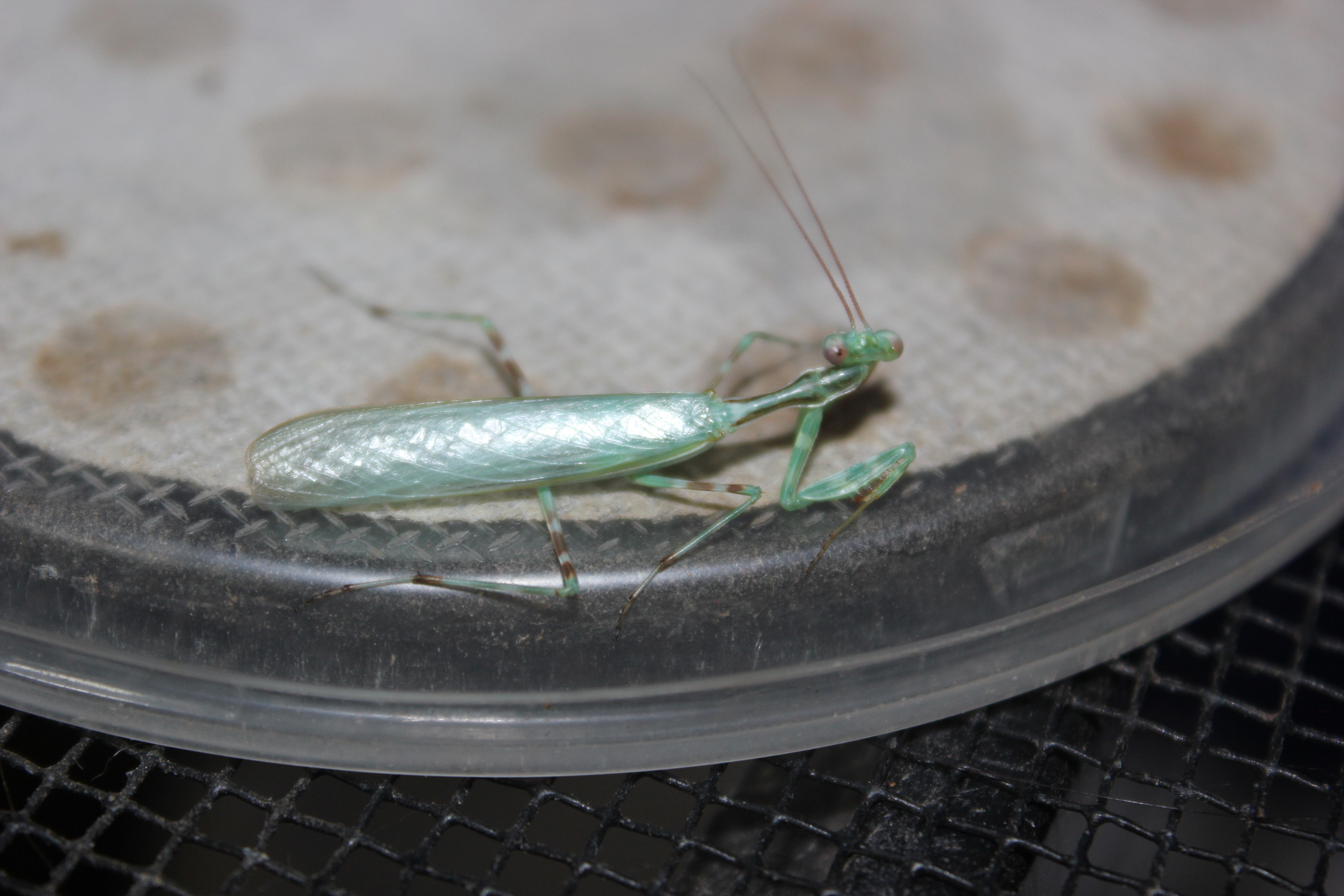
- Adult male

Scientific classification
- Kingdom: Animalia
- Phylum: Arthropoda
- Clade: Pancrustacea
- Class: Insecta
- Order: Mantodea
- Family: Miomantidae
- Genus: Miomantis
- Species: M. binotata

Binomial name
- Miomantis binotata (Giglio-Tos, 1911)

Synonyms
- Calidomantis binotata (Giglio-Tos, 1911)

= Miomantis binotata =

Species of praying mantis

Miomantis binotata, the African pinstripe mantis, is a small species of praying mantis found in Africa that are bred in captivity in the pet trade.

== Range ==
Miomantis binotata is widespread across southern and east Africa. This includes Kenya, Malawi, Rwanda, Tanzania, Togo (?), Burundi. Musina, South Africa.

== Additional images ==
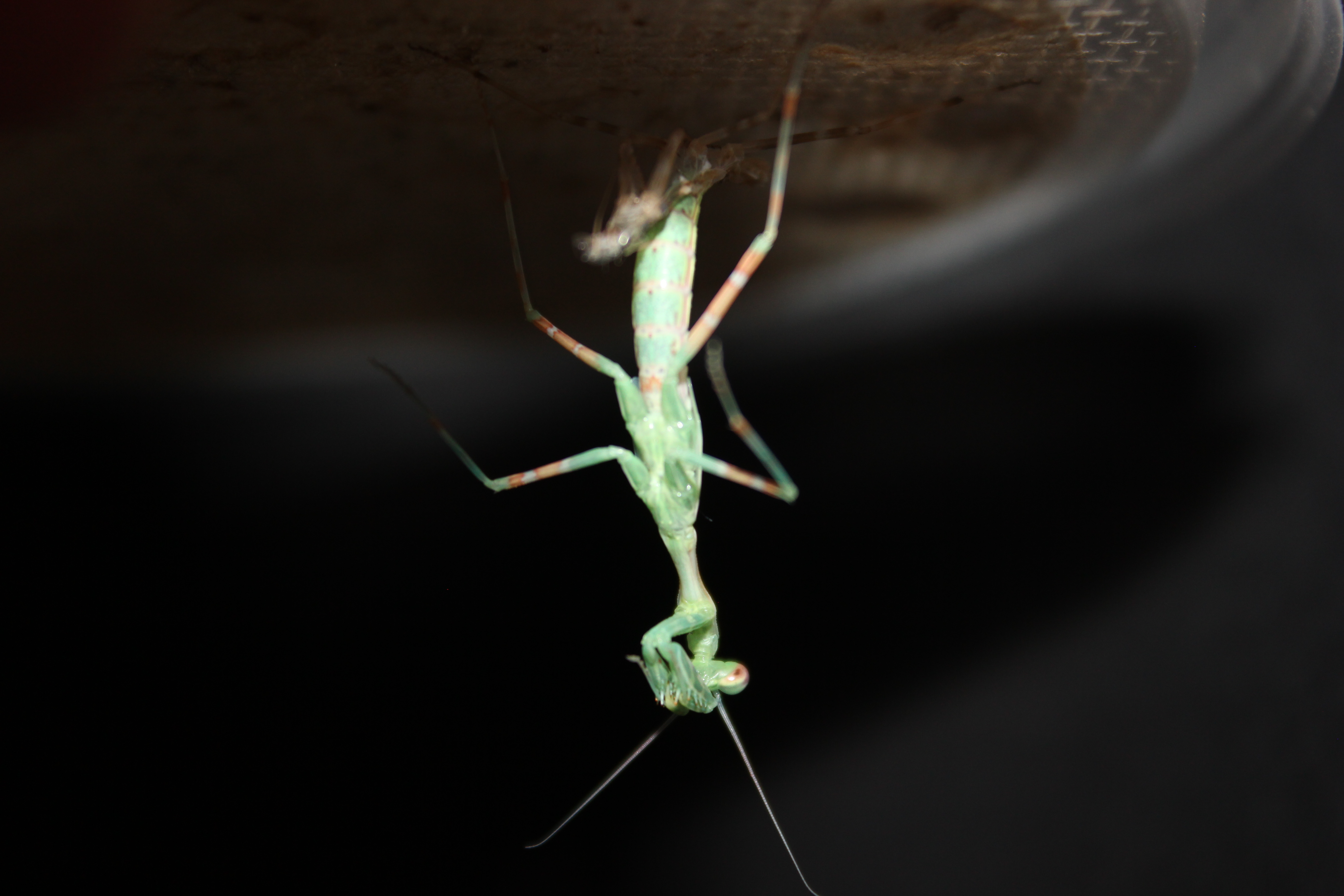
Male molting to sub-adult

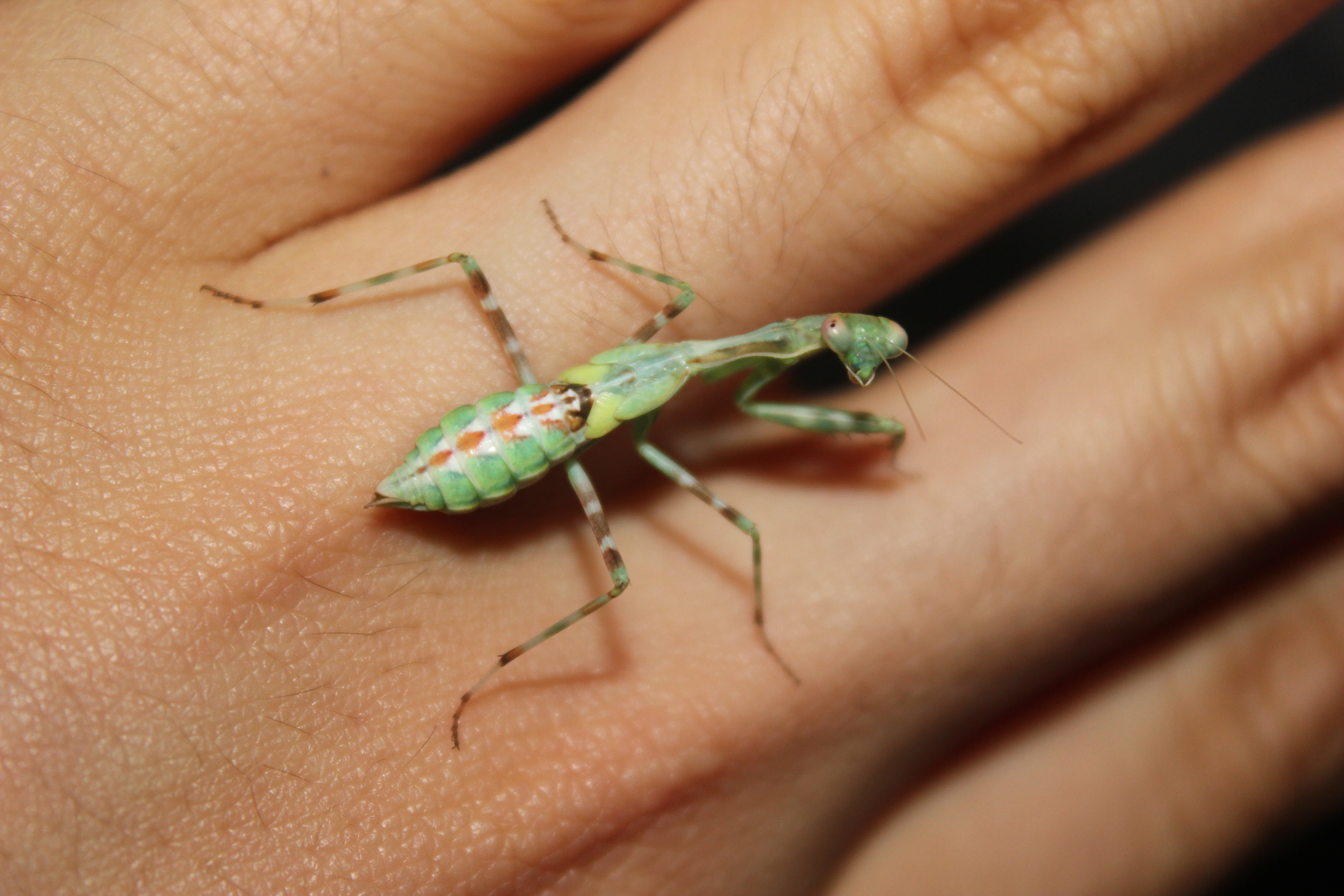
Female sub-adult with swollen wing-buds

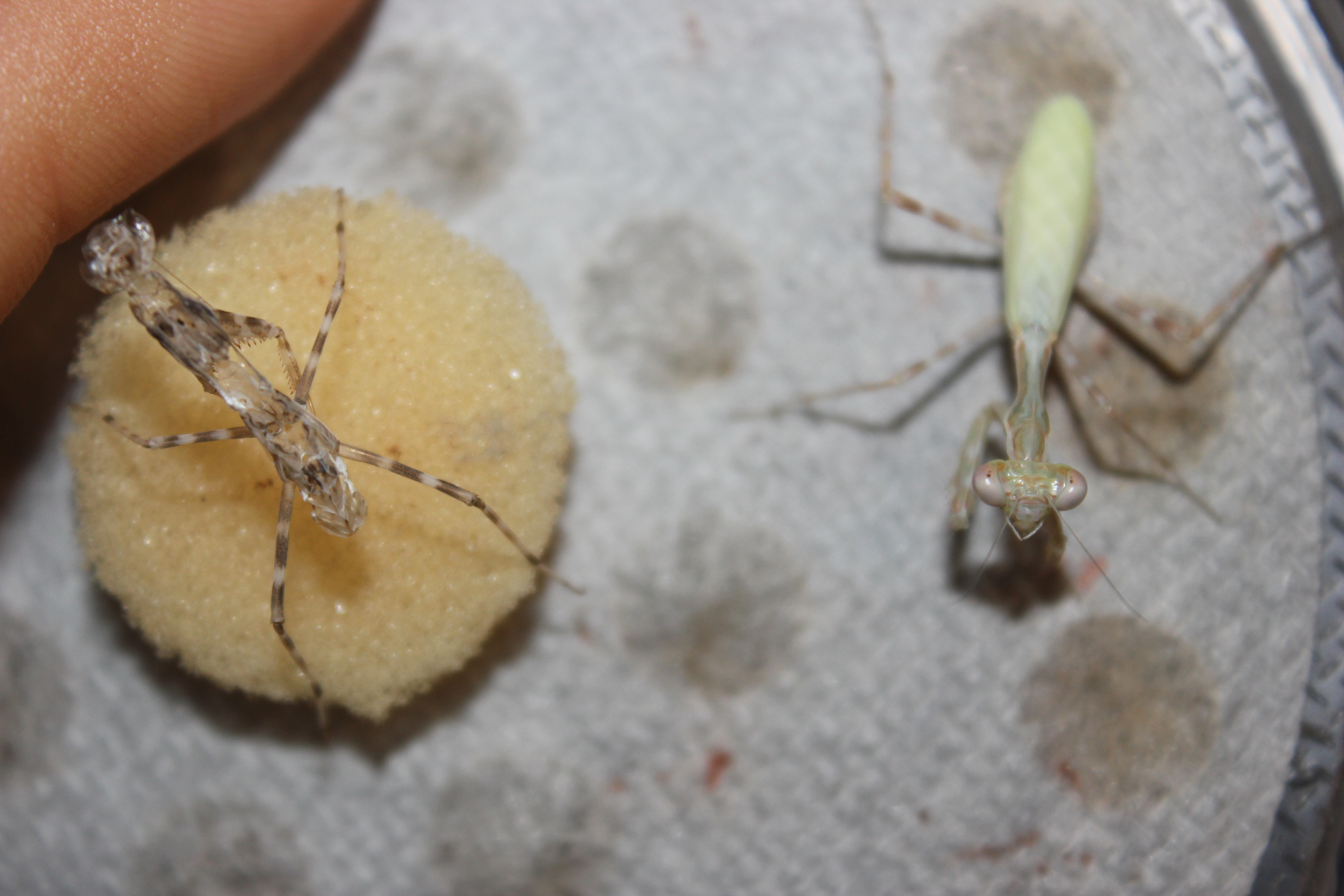
Adult female, recently gone through ecdysis

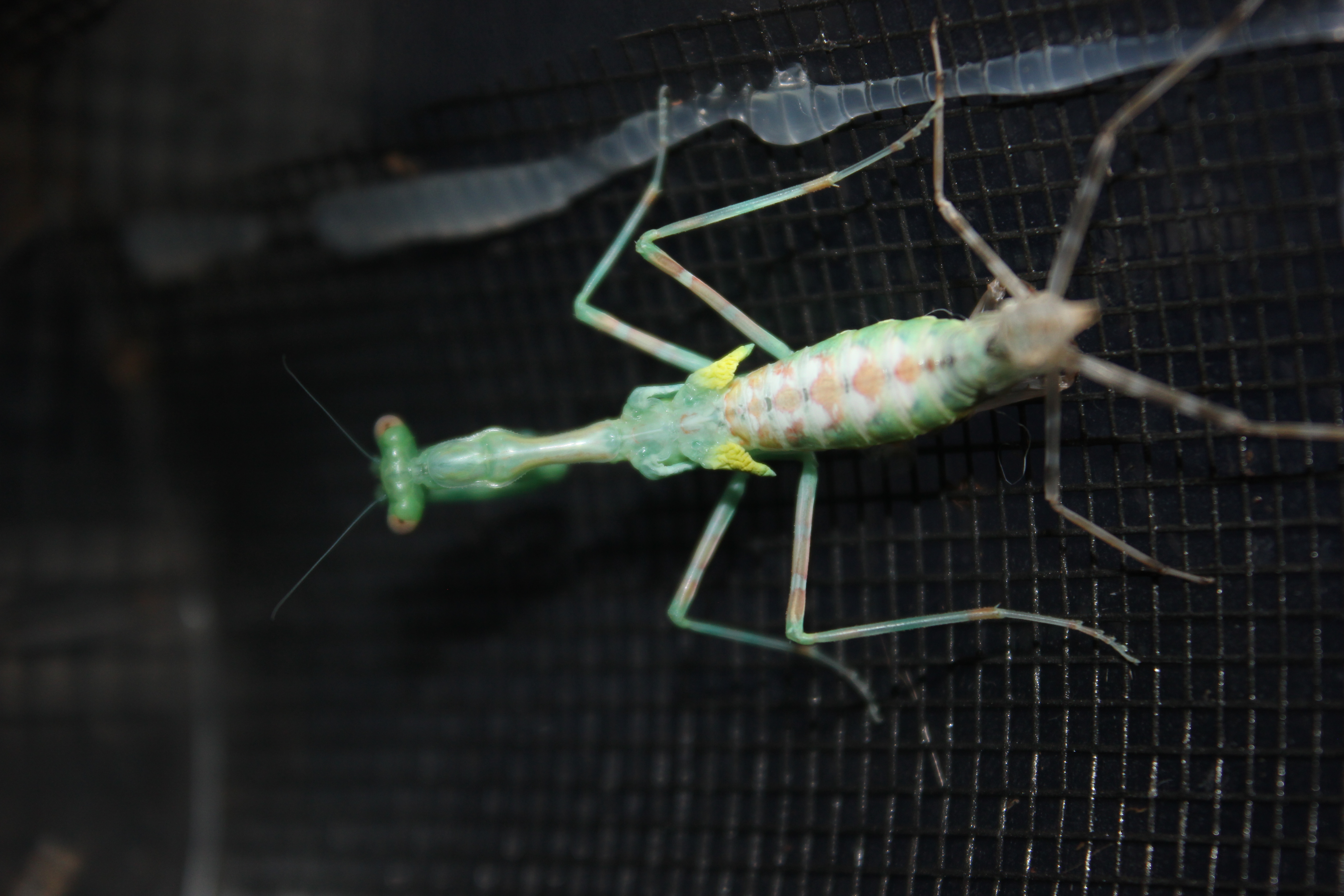
Female molting to adult

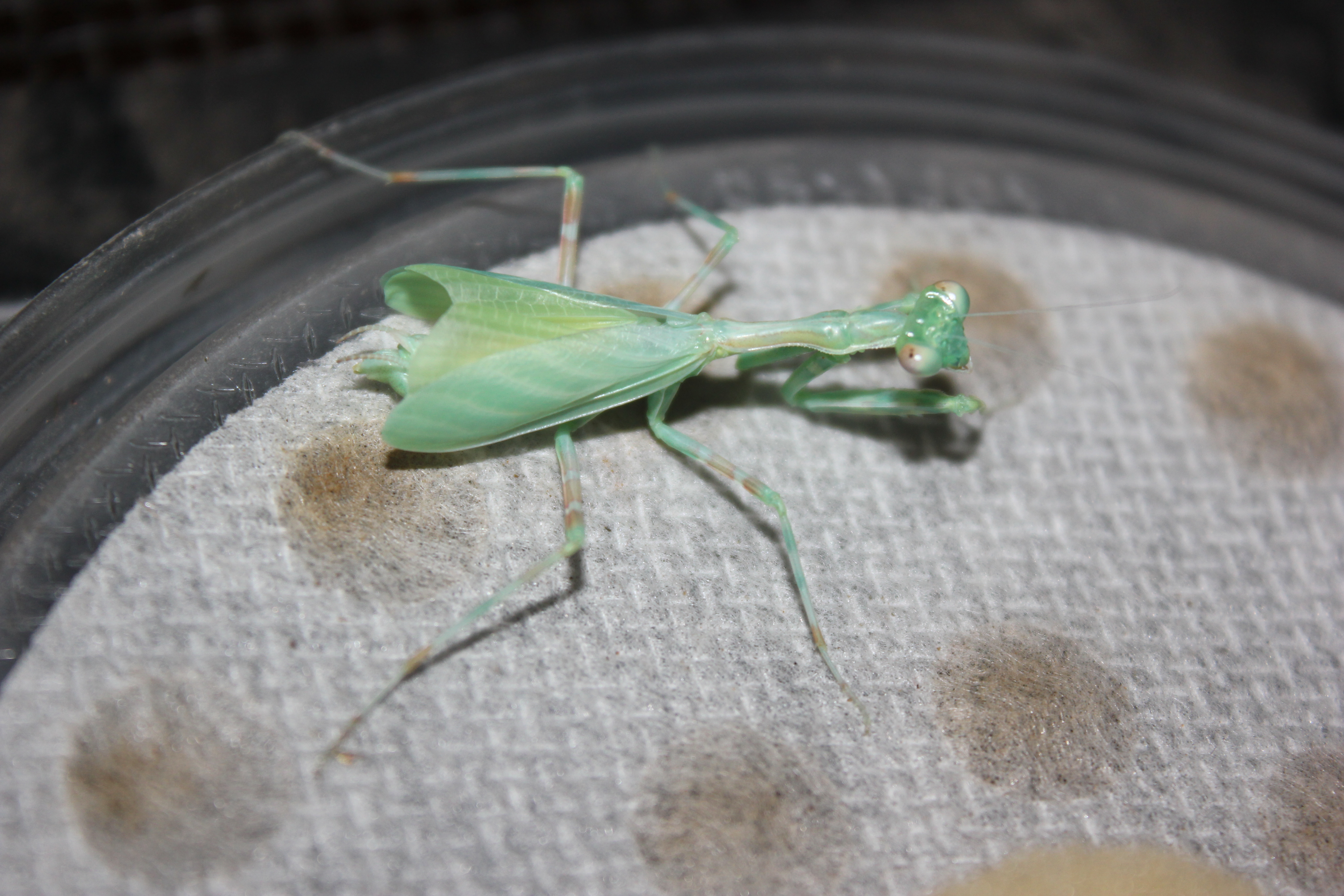
Adult female that has recently gone through ecdysis with her wings still not finished forming

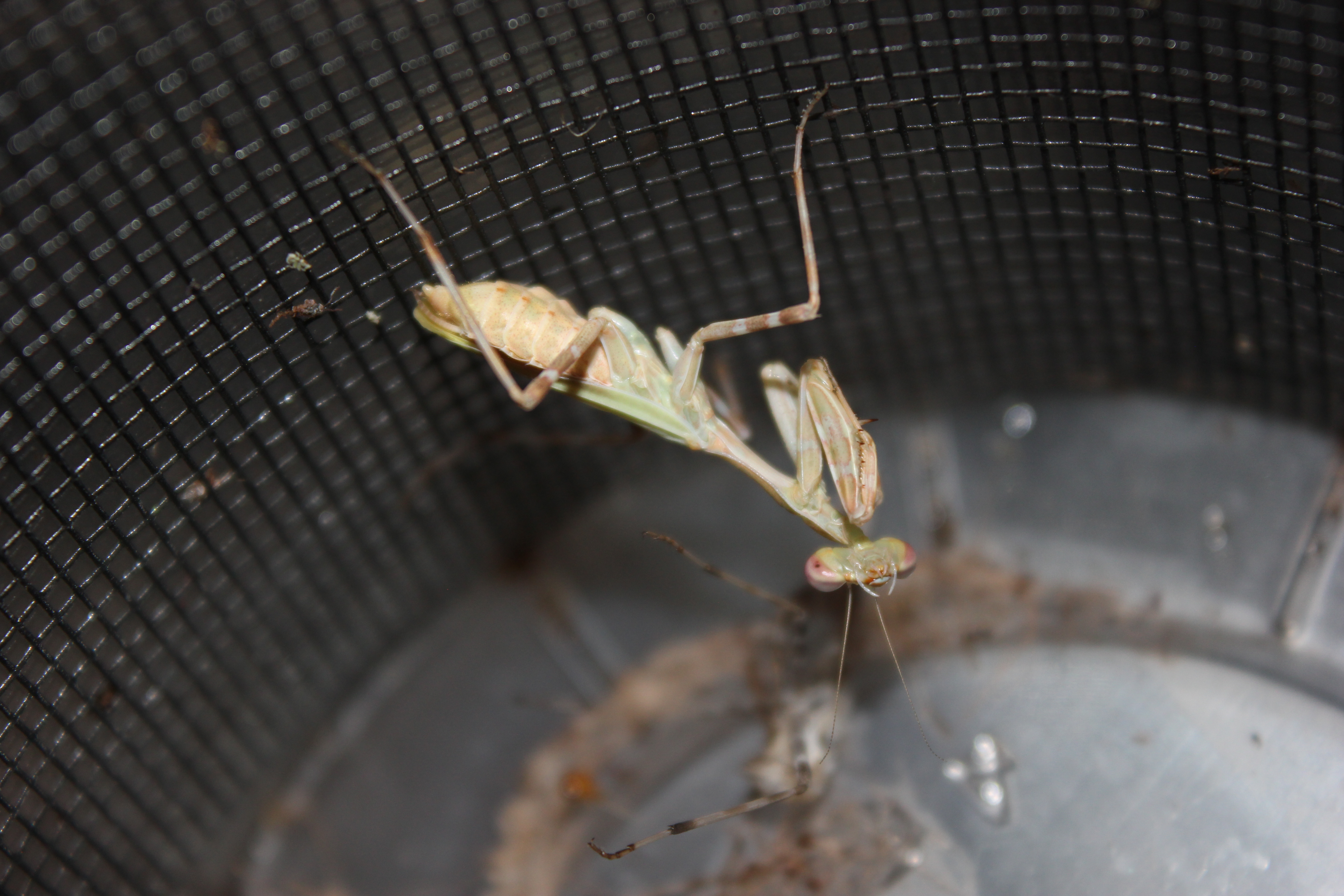
Light brown colored adult female

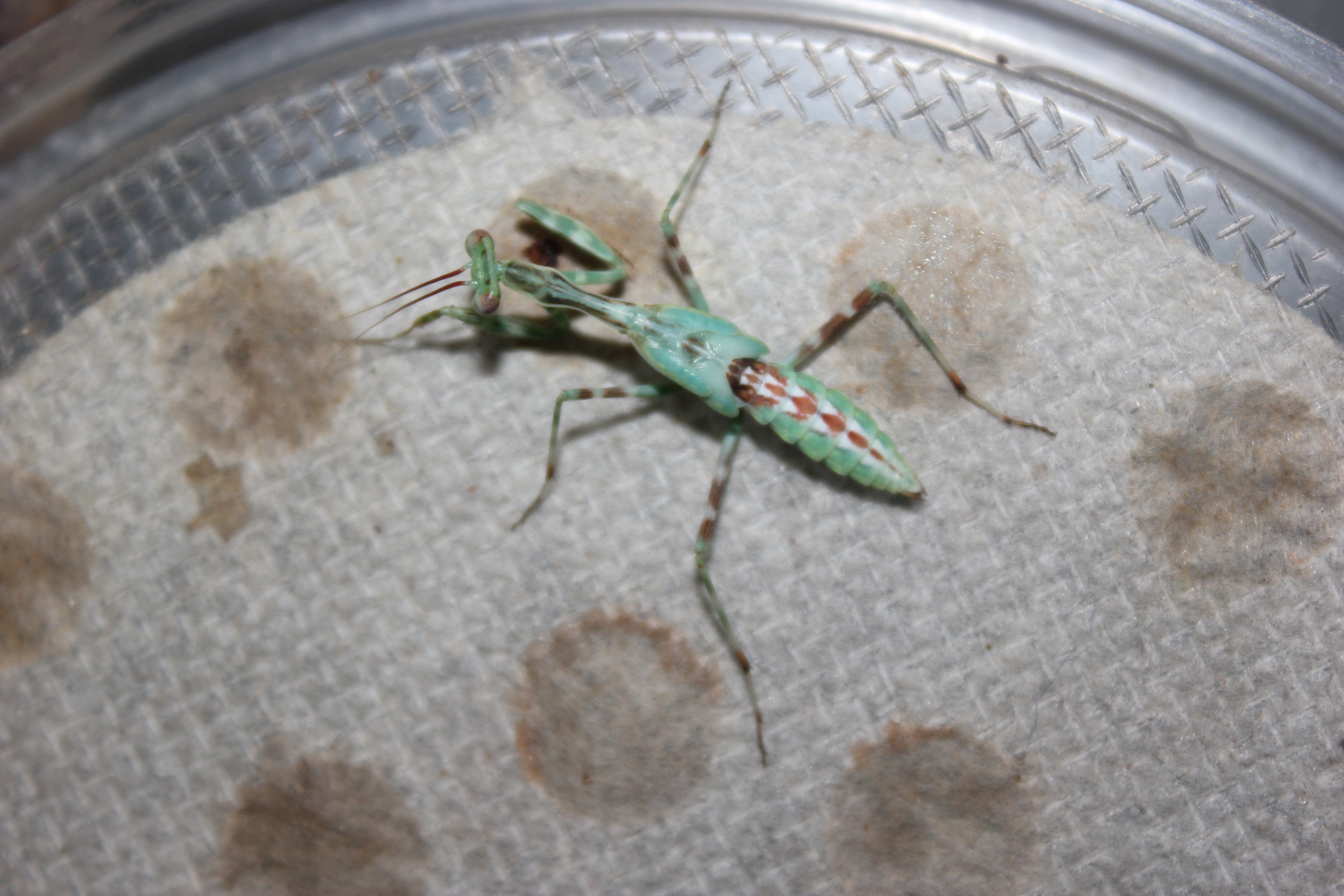
Male, sub-adult, with swollen wing-buds

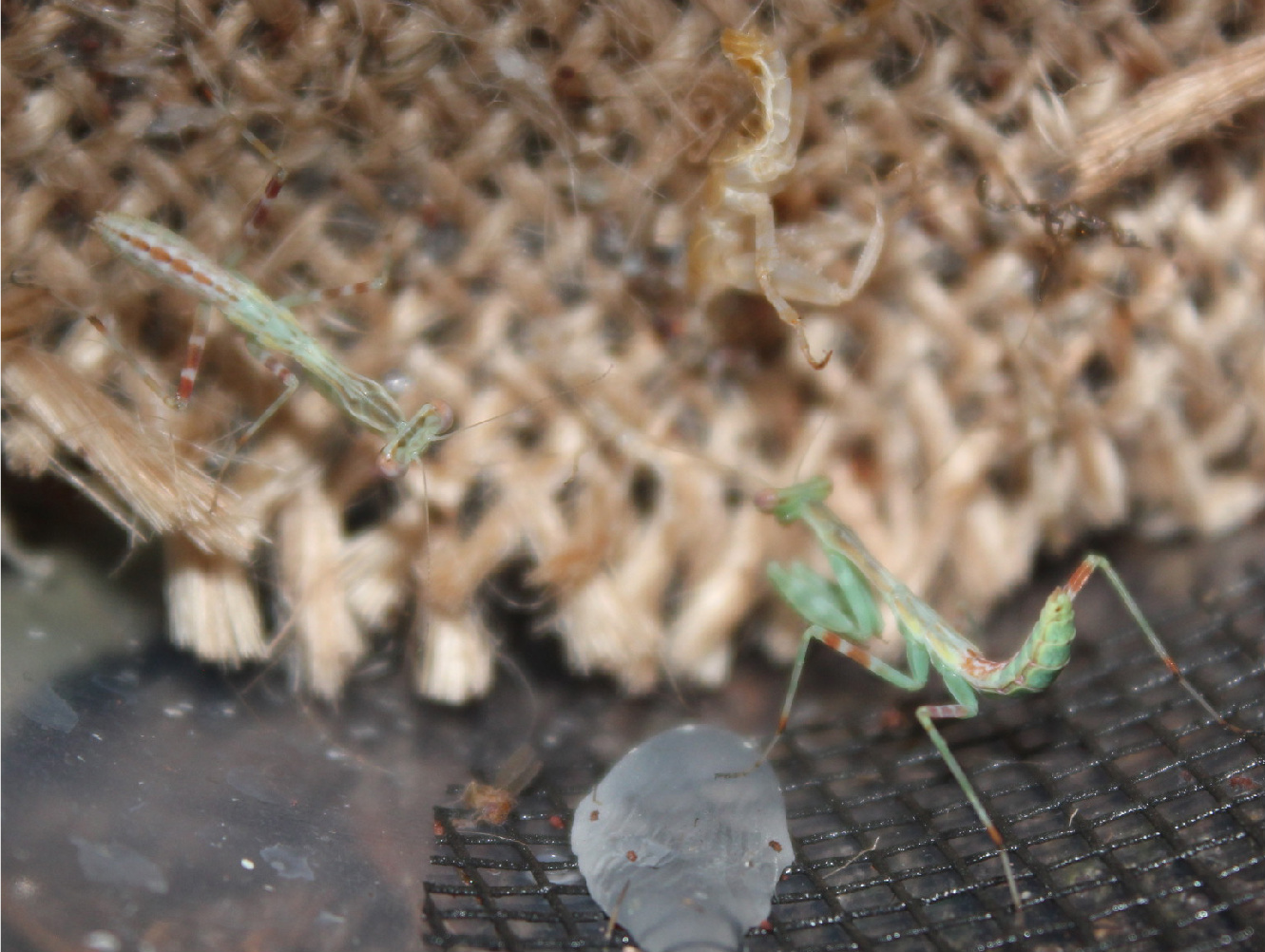
"Miomantis binotata" nymphs.

== See also ==
- List of mantis genera and species
