= Miomantis kibweziana =

Scientific classification
- Kingdom: Animalia
- Phylum: Arthropoda
- Class: Insecta
- Order: Mantodea
- Family: Miomantidae
- Genus: Miomantis
- Species: M. kibweziana

Binomial name
- Miomantis kibweziana Giglio-Tos, 1911

Species of praying mantis

Miomantis kibweziana is a species of praying mantis in the family Miomantidae.

== See also ==
- List of mantis genera and species
