= Miomantis mombasica =

Scientific classification
- Kingdom: Animalia
- Phylum: Arthropoda
- Clade: Pancrustacea
- Class: Insecta
- Order: Mantodea
- Family: Miomantidae
- Genus: Miomantis
- Species: M. mombasica

Binomial name
- Miomantis mombasica Giglio-Tos, 1911

Species of praying mantis

Miomantis mombasica is a species of praying mantis in the family Miomantidae, native to Africa.

It is named after Mombasa in Kenya.

== See also ==
- Mantises of Africa
- List of mantis genera and species
