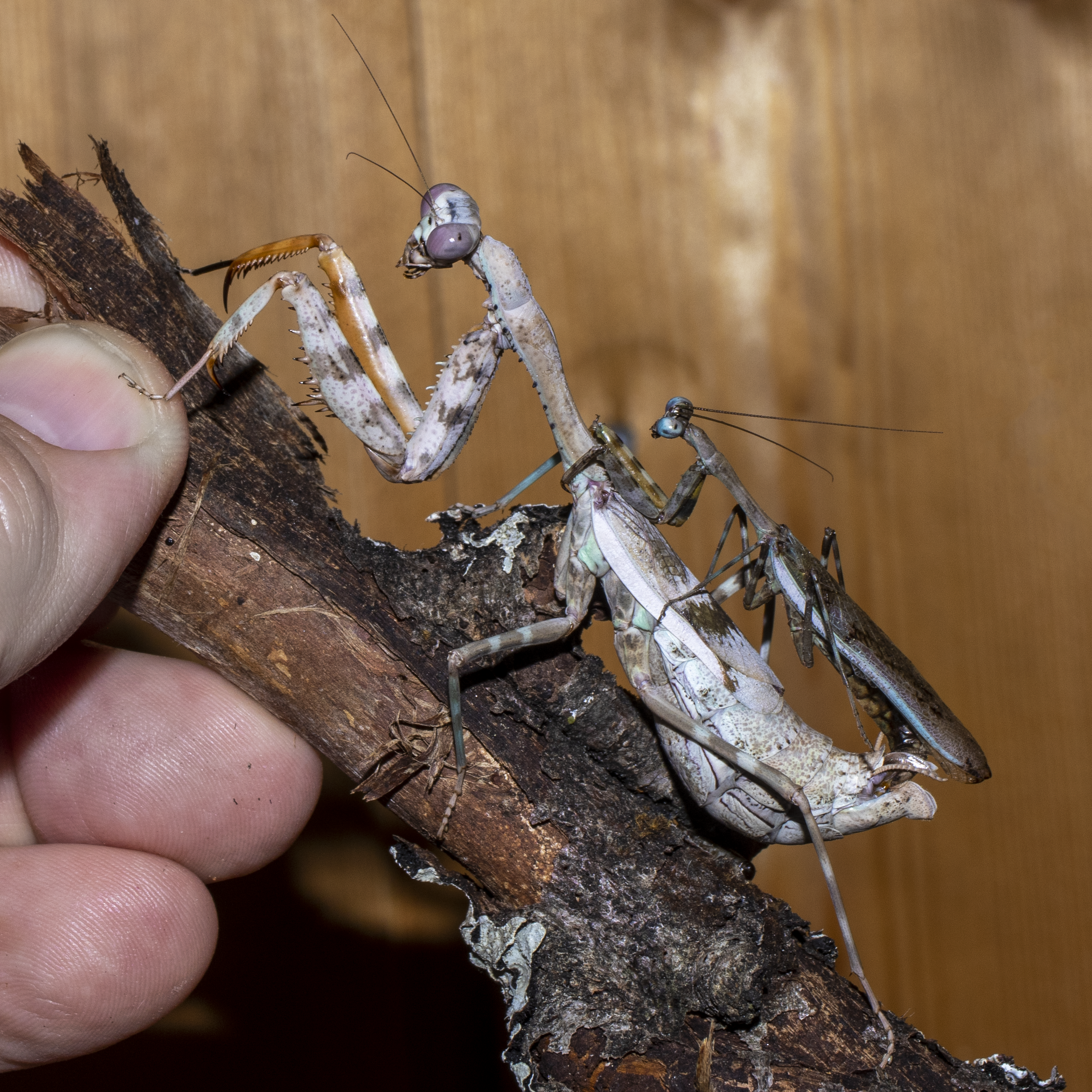

Scientific classification
- Kingdom: Animalia
- Phylum: Arthropoda
- Clade: Pancrustacea
- Class: Insecta
- Order: Mantodea
- Family: Miomantidae
- Genus: Parasphendale
- Species: P. affinis

Binomial name
- Parasphendale affinis Giglio-Tos, 1915

= Parasphendale affinis =

Species of praying mantis

Parasphendale affinis, common name budwing mantis, is a species of praying mantis. It is named for the female's short wings and can grow to 4 inches long and have a low mortality rate as nymphs. They originate from Kenya and are a mottled brown and reddish pink color. They have a voracious appetite, and have been known to gorge themselves to the point of illness when kept in captivity with an unlimited food source. Though they can be kept in captivity, due to their level of activity they require more space than other mantis species.
