= Miomantis nairobiensis =

Scientific classification
- Kingdom: Animalia
- Phylum: Arthropoda
- Clade: Pancrustacea
- Class: Insecta
- Order: Mantodea
- Family: Miomantidae
- Genus: Miomantis
- Species: M. nairobiensis

Binomial name
- Miomantis nairobiensis Bolivar, 1922

Species of praying mantis

Miomantis nairobiensis is a species of praying mantis in the family Miomantidae, native to Africa.

It is named after the city of Nairobi in Kenya.

== See also ==
- Mantises of Africa
- List of mantis genera and species
