= Hoplocorypha dentata =

Scientific classification
- Kingdom: Animalia
- Phylum: Arthropoda
- Clade: Pancrustacea
- Class: Insecta
- Order: Mantodea
- Family: Hoplocoryphidae
- Genus: Hoplocorypha
- Species: H. dentata

Binomial name
- Hoplocorypha dentata Giglio-Tos, 1916

Species of praying mantis

Hoplocorypha dentata is a species of praying mantis found in Kenya, Tanzania, and Zimbabwe.

== See also ==
- List of mantis genera and species
