= Miomantis natalica =

Scientific classification
- Domain: Eukaryota
- Kingdom: Animalia
- Phylum: Arthropoda
- Class: Insecta
- Order: Mantodea
- Family: Miomantidae
- Genus: Miomantis
- Species: M. natalica

Binomial name
- Miomantis natalica Beier, 1930

Species of praying mantis

Miomantis natalica is a species of praying mantis in the family Miomantidae.

== See also ==
- List of mantis genera and species
