= Hoplocorypha mellea =

Scientific classification
- Kingdom: Animalia
- Phylum: Arthropoda
- Clade: Pancrustacea
- Class: Insecta
- Order: Mantodea
- Family: Hoplocoryphidae
- Genus: Hoplocorypha
- Species: H. mellea

Binomial name
- Hoplocorypha mellea Giglio-Tos, 1916

Species of praying mantis

Hoplocorypha mellea is a species of praying mantis found in Ethiopia, Kenya, and Tanzania.

== See also ==
- List of mantis genera and species
