= Hoplocorypha boviformis =

Scientific classification
- Kingdom: Animalia
- Phylum: Arthropoda
- Clade: Pancrustacea
- Class: Insecta
- Order: Mantodea
- Family: Hoplocoryphidae
- Genus: Hoplocorypha
- Species: H. boviformis

Binomial name
- Hoplocorypha boviformis Rehn, 1912

Species of praying mantis

Hoplocorypha boviformis is a species of praying mantis found in Angola.

== See also ==
- List of mantis genera and species
