= Cilnia humeralis =

- Adult female Cilnia humeralis

Scientific classification
- Kingdom: Animalia
- Phylum: Arthropoda
- Clade: Pancrustacea
- Class: Insecta
- Order: Mantodea
- Family: Miomantidae
- Genus: Cilnia
- Species: C. humeralis

Binomial name
- Cilnia humeralis Saussure, 1871

Subspecies
- Cilnia humeralis femoralis (Werner, 1906); Cilnia humeralis humeralis (Saussure, 1871)

Species of praying mantis

Cilnia humeralis, common name wide-armed mantis, is an aggressive and very cannibalistic species of praying mantis from Africa.

A breeder in Great Britain describes C. humeralis as "a very stockily built species with huge forelegs; possibly the most powerful and aggressive species I have kept."

== Subspecies ==
This species of mantis contains two subspecies.

=== Cilnia humeralis femoralis (Werner, 1906) ===
This subspecies of mantis is found in Tanzania.

=== Cilnia humeralis humeralis (Saussure, 1871) ===
This subspecies of mantis is found in Ethiopia, Mozambique, South Africa, Namibia.

Synonyms of this subspecies include:

- Cilnia humeralis brevipennis (Schulthess-Rechberg, 1899)
- Cilnia humeralis ignota (Rehn, 1904)
- Cilnia humeralis latipes (Stal, 1876)
