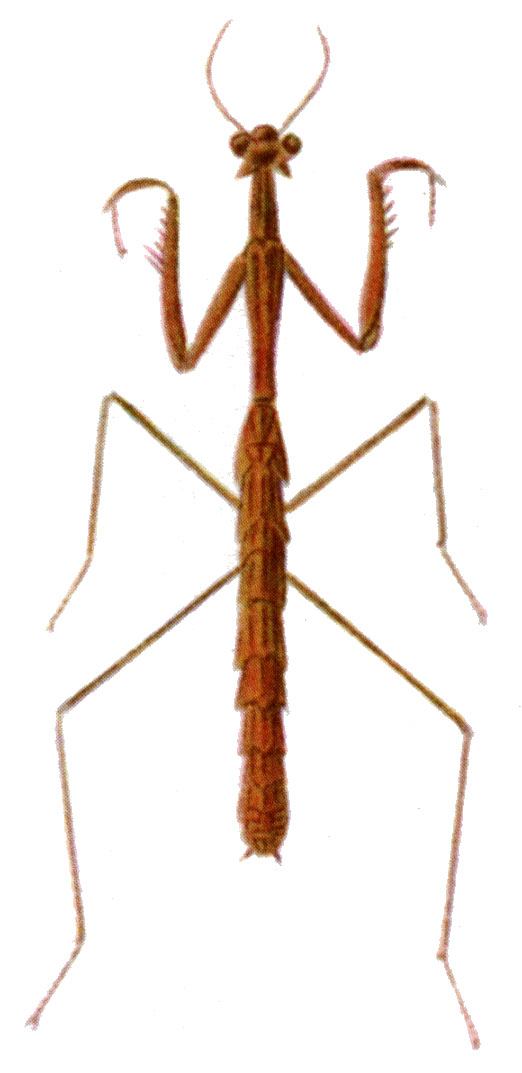

Scientific classification
- Kingdom: Animalia
- Phylum: Arthropoda
- Clade: Pancrustacea
- Class: Insecta
- Order: Mantodea
- Family: Hoplocoryphidae
- Genus: Hoplocorypha
- Species: H. macra

Binomial name
- Hoplocorypha macra Stål, 1856

= Hoplocorypha macra =

Species of praying mantis

Hoplocorypha macra is a species of praying mantis found in Angola, Kenya, Namibia, South Africa (Cape Province, Natal, Transvaal), Tanzania, Uganda, and Zambia.

== See also ==
- List of mantis genera and species
