= Jurinia =

Scientific classification
- Kingdom: Animalia
- Phylum: Arthropoda
- Class: Insecta
- Order: Diptera
- Family: Tachinidae
- Subfamily: Tachininae
- Tribe: Tachinini
- Genus: Jurinia; Robineau-Desvoidy, 1830

Type species
- Jurinia gagatea Robineau-Desvoidy, 1830

Synonyms
- Jurinea Thomson, 1869; Microtrichomma Giglio-Tos, 1893; Proepalpus Townsend, 1927

Genus of flies

Jurinia is a genus of flies in the family Tachinidae.

== Species ==
- Jurinia barbata Bigot, 1887
- Jurinia fuliginipennis Bigot, 1888
- Jurinia gagatea Robineau-Desvoidy, 1830
- Jurinia hyalipennis (Macquart, 1835)
- Jurinia laticornis Macquart, 1846
- Jurinia nigriventris Robineau-Desvoidy, 1863
- Jurinia olivaurea Townsend, 1914
- Jurinia paulensis (Townsend, 1927)
- Jurinia pompalis (Reinhard, 1941)
- Jurinia rufipalpis Macquart, 1844
- Jurinia smithi (Wulp, 1890)
- Jurinia surinamensis Macquart, 1844
- Jurinia versicolor Robineau-Desvoidy, 1863
