= Hoplocorypha wittei =

Scientific classification
- Kingdom: Animalia
- Phylum: Arthropoda
- Clade: Pancrustacea
- Class: Insecta
- Order: Mantodea
- Family: Hoplocoryphidae
- Genus: Hoplocorypha
- Species: H. wittei

Binomial name
- Hoplocorypha wittei Beier, 1954

Species of praying mantis

Hoplocorypha wittei is a species of praying mantis found in the Congo River region.

== See also ==
- List of mantis genera and species
