= Hoplocorypha distinguenda =

Scientific classification
- Kingdom: Animalia
- Phylum: Arthropoda
- Clade: Pancrustacea
- Class: Insecta
- Order: Mantodea
- Family: Hoplocoryphidae
- Genus: Hoplocorypha
- Species: H. distinguenda

Binomial name
- Hoplocorypha distinguenda Beier, 1930

Species of praying mantis

Hoplocorypha distinguenda is a species of praying mantis found in Nigeria.

== See also ==
- List of mantis genera and species
