= Hoplocorypha striata =

Scientific classification
- Kingdom: Animalia
- Phylum: Arthropoda
- Clade: Pancrustacea
- Class: Insecta
- Order: Mantodea
- Family: Hoplocoryphidae
- Genus: Hoplocorypha
- Species: H. striata

Binomial name
- Hoplocorypha striata Beier, 1930

Species of praying mantis

Hoplocorypha striata is a species of praying mantis found in Namibia.

== See also ==
- List of mantis genera and species
