= Cilnia chopardi =

Scientific classification
- Kingdom: Animalia
- Phylum: Arthropoda
- Clade: Pancrustacea
- Class: Insecta
- Order: Mantodea
- Family: Miomantidae
- Genus: Cilnia
- Species: C. chopardi

Binomial name
- Cilnia chopardi Werner, 1927

Synonyms
- Cilnia cochlearis (Sjostedt, 1930)

Species of praying mantis

Cilnia chopardi is a species of praying mantis in the family Miomantidae.

The species in native to South Africa.

== See also ==
- List of mantis genera and species
