= Hoplocorypha nigerica =

Scientific classification
- Kingdom: Animalia
- Phylum: Arthropoda
- Clade: Pancrustacea
- Class: Insecta
- Order: Mantodea
- Family: Hoplocoryphidae
- Genus: Hoplocorypha
- Species: H. nigerica

Binomial name
- Hoplocorypha nigerica Beier, 1930

Species of praying mantis

Hoplocorypha nigerica is a species of praying mantis found in western Africa (Burkina Faso, Ghana, and Nigeria).

== See also ==
- List of mantis genera and species
