= Chaetona =

Scientific classification
- Kingdom: Animalia
- Phylum: Arthropoda
- Class: Insecta
- Order: Diptera
- Family: Tachinidae
- Subfamily: Exoristinae
- Tribe: Blondeliini
- Genus: Chaetona; Wulp, 1891

Type species
- Dexia longiseta Wiedemann, 1830

Genus of flies

Chaetona is a genus of flies in the family Tachinidae.

== Species ==
- Chaetona concinna Wulp, 1890
- Chaetona congrua Wulp, 1891
- Chaetona cruenta Giglio-Tos, 1893
- Chaetona icterica (Wiedemann, 1830)
- Chaetona longiseta (Wiedemann, 1830)
- Chaetona pictilis Reinhard, 1975
- Chaetona piliseta (Wulp, 1890)
- Chaetona tuchucheensis Thompson, 1968
