= Hoplocorypha perplexa =

Scientific classification
- Kingdom: Animalia
- Phylum: Arthropoda
- Clade: Pancrustacea
- Class: Insecta
- Order: Mantodea
- Family: Hoplocoryphidae
- Genus: Hoplocorypha
- Species: H. perplexa

Binomial name
- Hoplocorypha perplexa Rehn, 1912

Species of praying mantis

Hoplocorypha perplexa is a species of praying mantis found in Angola, Namibia, Tanzania, Zimbabwe and the Congo River area.

== See also ==
- List of mantis genera and species
