= Miomantis fenestrata =

Scientific classification
- Domain: Eukaryota
- Kingdom: Animalia
- Phylum: Arthropoda
- Class: Insecta
- Order: Mantodea
- Family: Miomantidae
- Genus: Miomantis
- Species: M. fenestrata

Binomial name
- Miomantis fenestrata Fabricius, 1781

Synonyms
- Miomantis crystalina Lichtenstein, 1796; Miomantis marginalis Saussure, 1871; Miomantis minor Giglio-Tos, 1911; Miomantis nana Stoll, 1813

Species of praying mantis

Miomantis fenestrata is a species of praying mantis in the family Miomantidae.

== See also ==
- List of mantis genera and species
