= Hoplocorypha lobata =

Scientific classification
- Kingdom: Animalia
- Phylum: Arthropoda
- Clade: Pancrustacea
- Class: Insecta
- Order: Mantodea
- Family: Hoplocoryphidae
- Genus: Hoplocorypha
- Species: H. lobata

Binomial name
- Hoplocorypha lobata Roy, 1969

Species of praying mantis

Hoplocorypha lobata is a species of praying mantis found in Senegal.

== See also ==
- List of mantis genera and species
