= Hoplocorypha bottegi =

Scientific classification
- Kingdom: Animalia
- Phylum: Arthropoda
- Clade: Pancrustacea
- Class: Insecta
- Order: Mantodea
- Family: Hoplocoryphidae
- Genus: Hoplocorypha
- Species: H. bottegi

Binomial name
- Hoplocorypha bottegi Saussure, 1895

Species of praying mantis

Hoplocorypha bottegi is a species of praying mantis found in Ethiopia, Somalia, and Tanzania.

== See also ==
- List of mantis genera and species
