= Parasphendale agrionina =

Scientific classification
- Kingdom: Animalia
- Phylum: Arthropoda
- Clade: Pancrustacea
- Class: Insecta
- Order: Mantodea
- Family: Miomantidae
- Genus: Parasphendale
- Species: P. agrionina

Binomial name
- Parasphendale agrionina Gerstaecker, 1869

Species of praying mantis

Parasphendale agrionina species of praying mantis in the family Miomantidae. It has been given the common name budwing mantis for its vestigial wings (present in adult females). Females are incapable of flight.

== Description ==
Females can grow to 2.75 inches (7 cm) long and males to 1.25 inches (3 cm) long.

== Distribution ==
The budwing mantis is found primarily in East Africa, specifically in Kenya, Somalia, and Ethiopia.

== See also ==
- List of mantis genera and species
