= Hoplocorypha bicornis =

Scientific classification
- Kingdom: Animalia
- Phylum: Arthropoda
- Clade: Pancrustacea
- Class: Insecta
- Order: Mantodea
- Family: Hoplocoryphidae
- Genus: Hoplocorypha
- Species: H. bicornis

Binomial name
- Hoplocorypha bicornis Deelemann-Reinhold, 1957

Species of praying mantis

Hoplocorypha bicornis is a species of praying mantis found in the Transvaal region of South Africa.

== See also ==
- List of mantis genera and species
