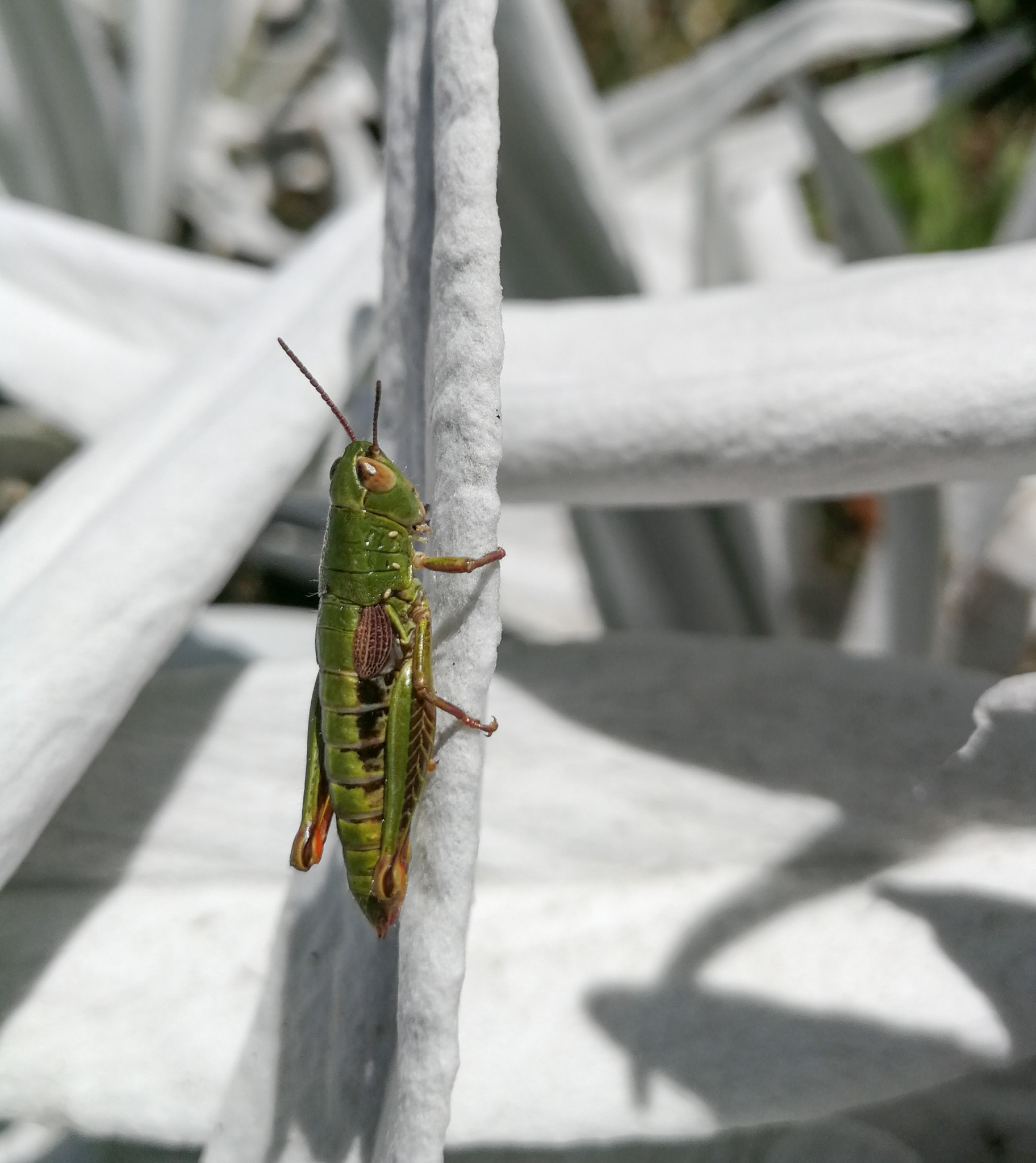
- Jivarus antisanae, Ecuador

Scientific classification
- Domain: Eukaryota
- Kingdom: Animalia
- Phylum: Arthropoda
- Class: Insecta
- Order: Orthoptera
- Suborder: Caelifera
- Family: Acrididae
- Subfamily: Melanoplinae
- Tribe: Jivarini
- Genus: Jivarus; Giglio-Tos, 1898

= Jivarus =

Genus of insects

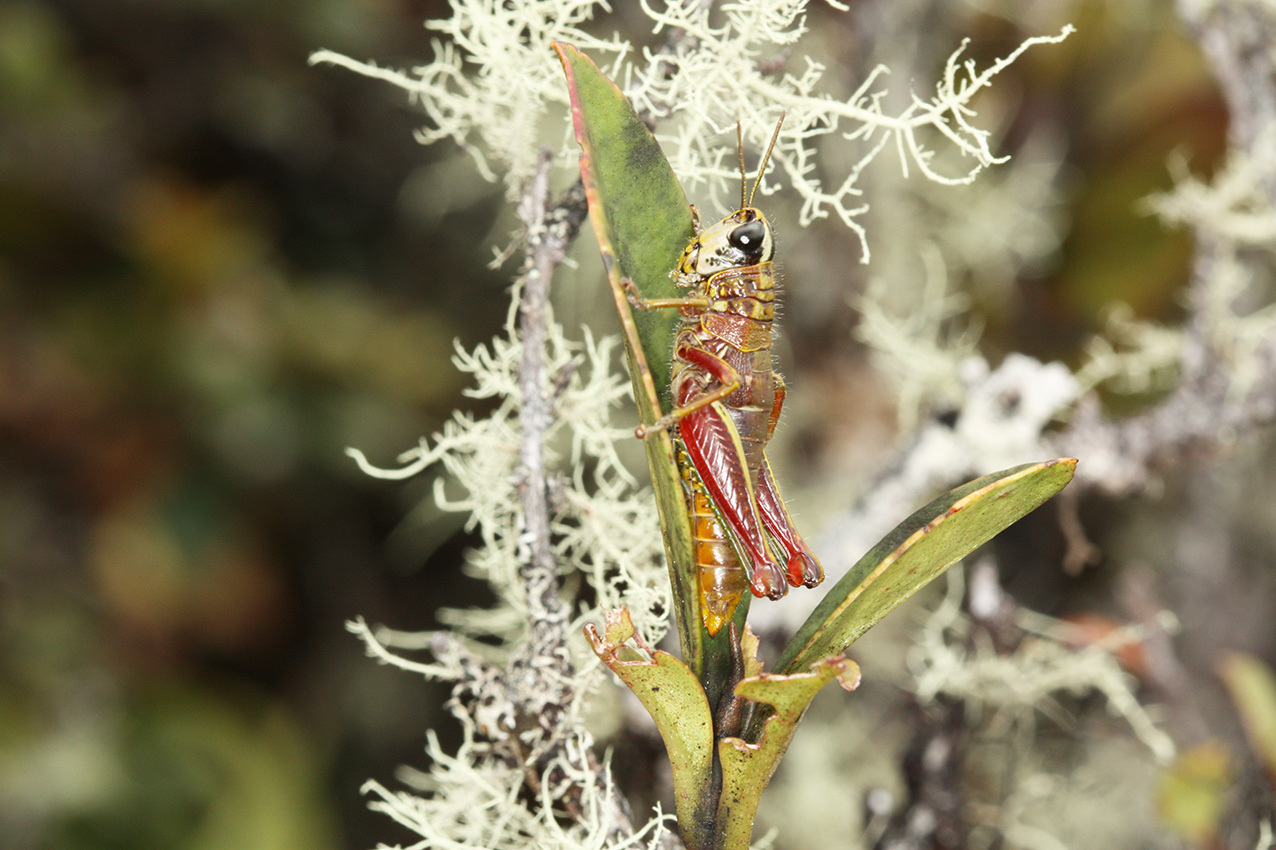
Jivarus ronderosi, Ecuador

Jivarus is a genus of spur-throated grasshoppers in the family Acrididae. There are more than 20 described species in Jivarus, found in Ecuador, Colombia, and Peru.

== Species ==
These 29 species belong to the genus Jivarus:

- Jivarus alienus (Walker, 1870) (Colombia and Ecuador)
- Jivarus alticola Ronderos, 1981 (Colombia)
- Jivarus americanus Giglio-Tos, 1898 (Ecuador)
- Jivarus antisanae (Bolívar, 1881) (Ecuador)
- Jivarus auriculus Cigliano & Amédégnato, 2010 (Ecuador)
- Jivarus brunneus Ronderos, 1981 (Colombia)
- Jivarus carbonelli Ronderos, 1979 (Colombia and Ecuador)
- Jivarus cohni Ronderos, 1979 (Ecuador)
- Jivarus discoloris Cigliano & Amédégnato, 2010 (Peru)
- Jivarus ecuadoricus (Hebard, 1924) (Ecuador)
- Jivarus eumera (Hebard, 1923) (Colombia)
- Jivarus guarandaensis Cigliano & Amédégnato, 2010 (Ecuador)
- Jivarus gurneyi Ronderos, 1979 (Ecuador)
- Jivarus hubbelli Ronderos, 1979 (Ecuador)
- Jivarus jagoi Ronderos, 1979 (Ecuador)
- Jivarus laevis Ronderos, 1979 (Ecuador)
- Jivarus marginalis Ronderos, 1979 (Colombia)
- Jivarus megacercus Cigliano & Amédégnato, 2010 (Ecuador)
- Jivarus ochraceus Ronderos, 1981 (Inga Grasshopper) (Colombia)
- Jivarus pictifrons Ronderos, 1979 (Jimbura Mountain Grasshopper) (Ecuador and Peru)
- Jivarus profundus Cigliano & Amédégnato, 2010 (Ecuador)
- Jivarus pubescens Ronderos, 1979 (Ecuador)
- Jivarus rectus Cigliano & Amédégnato, 2010 (Ecuador)
- Jivarus rentzi Ronderos, 1979 (Ecuador)
- Jivarus riveti Cigliano & Amédégnato, 2010 (Ecuador)
- Jivarus ronderosi Cigliano & Amédégnato, 2010 (Ecuador)
- Jivarus spatulus Cigliano & Amédégnato, 2010 (Ecuador)
- Jivarus sphaericus Cigliano & Amédégnato, 2010 (Ecuador)
- Jivarus viridis Ronderos, 1979 (Ecuador)
