= Hoplocorypha boromensis =

Scientific classification
- Kingdom: Animalia
- Phylum: Arthropoda
- Clade: Pancrustacea
- Class: Insecta
- Order: Mantodea
- Family: Hoplocoryphidae
- Genus: Hoplocorypha
- Species: H. boromensis

Binomial name
- Hoplocorypha boromensis Brancsik, 1897

Species of praying mantis

Hoplocorypha boromensis is a species of praying mantis found in Zambia.

== See also ==
- List of mantis genera and species
