= Hoplocorypha brevicollis =

Scientific classification
- Kingdom: Animalia
- Phylum: Arthropoda
- Clade: Pancrustacea
- Class: Insecta
- Order: Mantodea
- Family: Hoplocoryphidae
- Genus: Hoplocorypha
- Species: H. brevicollis

Binomial name
- Hoplocorypha brevicollis Beier, 1931

Species of praying mantis

Hoplocorypha brevicollis is a species of praying mantis found in South Africa.

== See also ==
- List of mantis genera and species
