= H. nigra =

H. nigra may refer to:

- Hoplocorypha nigra, a praying mantis species found in the region of the Congo River
- Hopea nigra, a plant species

== See also ==
- Nigra (disambiguation)
