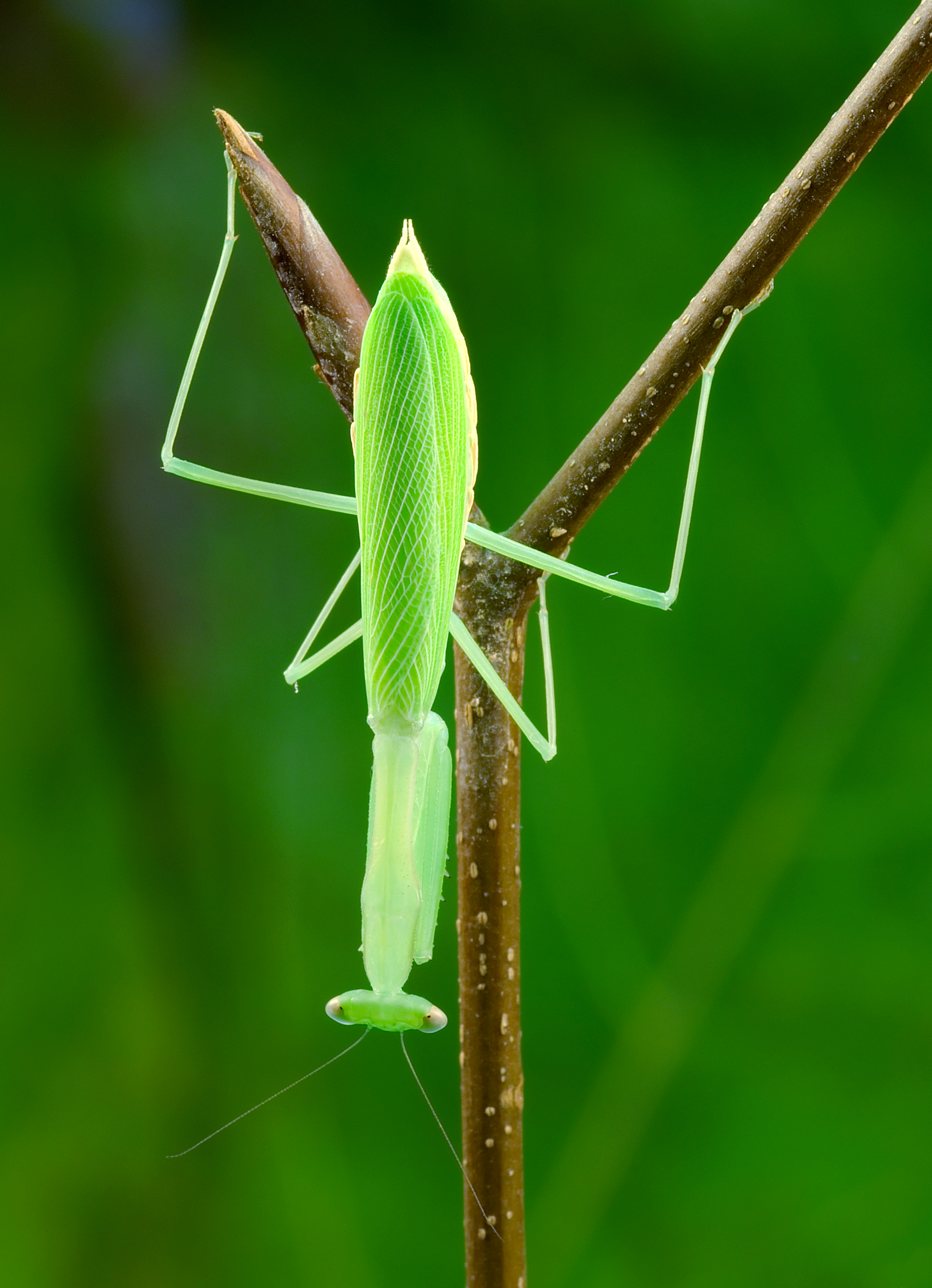
- Adult female

Scientific classification
- Kingdom: Animalia
- Phylum: Arthropoda
- Clade: Pancrustacea
- Class: Insecta
- Order: Mantodea
- Family: Miomantidae
- Genus: Miomantis
- Species: M. paykullii

Binomial name
- Miomantis paykullii (Stal, 1871)

Synonyms
- Miomantis pharaonica Saussure, 1898; Miomantis pharaonis Kirby, 1904; Miomantis savignyi Saussure, 1872; Miomantis senegalensis Schulthess-Rechberg, 1899

= Miomantis paykullii =

Species of praying mantis

Miomantis paykullii is a species of praying mantis in the family Miomantidae.

It is one of several species sometimes known as the Egyptian praying mantis, along with Miomantis abyssinica.

The species is found in a number of African countries, including Egypt, Ivory Coast, Ghana, Uganda, Senegal and Togo, as well as Israel, in the Middle East.

It grows to an adult size of 3.5-4.5 cm.

== See also ==
- Mantises of Africa
- List of mantis genera and species
