= Hoplocorypha ugandana =

Scientific classification
- Kingdom: Animalia
- Phylum: Arthropoda
- Clade: Pancrustacea
- Class: Insecta
- Order: Mantodea
- Family: Hoplocoryphidae
- Genus: Hoplocorypha
- Species: H. ugandana

Binomial name
- Hoplocorypha ugandana Beier, 1930

Species of praying mantis

Hoplocorypha ugandana is a species of praying mantis found in Uganda.

== See also ==
- List of mantis genera and species
