= Hoplocorypha nana =

Scientific classification
- Kingdom: Animalia
- Phylum: Arthropoda
- Clade: Pancrustacea
- Class: Insecta
- Order: Mantodea
- Family: Hoplocoryphidae
- Genus: Hoplocorypha
- Species: H. nana

Binomial name
- Hoplocorypha nana Sjöstedt, 1909

Species of praying mantis

Hoplocorypha nana is a species of praying mantis found in Uganda and South Africa (Zululand).

== See also ==
- List of mantis genera and species
