= Scotiptera =

Scientific classification
- Kingdom: Animalia
- Phylum: Arthropoda
- Class: Insecta
- Order: Diptera
- Family: Tachinidae
- Subfamily: Dexiinae
- Tribe: Dexiini
- Genus: Scotiptera; Macquart, 1835

Type species
- Dexia melaleuca Fabricius, 1805

Synonyms
- Scotioptera Blanchard, 1840; Scotoptera Agassiz, 1846

Genus of flies

Scotiptera is a genus of flies in the family Tachinidae.

== Species ==
- Scotiptera cyanea Giglio-Tos, 1893
- Scotiptera gagatea (Robineau-Desvoidy, 1830)
- Scotiptera pellucida (Robineau-Desvoidy, 1830)
- Scotiptera robusta Curran, 1925
- Scotiptera varipennis Wulp, 1891
- Scotiptera venatoria (Fabricius, 1805)
