= M. fenestrata =

M. fenestrata may refer to:

- Miomantis fenestrata, a praying mantis species
- Moraea fenestrata, (Goldblatt) Goldblatt, a plant species in the genus Moraea
- Myopa fenestrata, Coquillett, 1902, a fly species in the genus Myopa

== See also ==
- Fenestrata (disambiguation)
