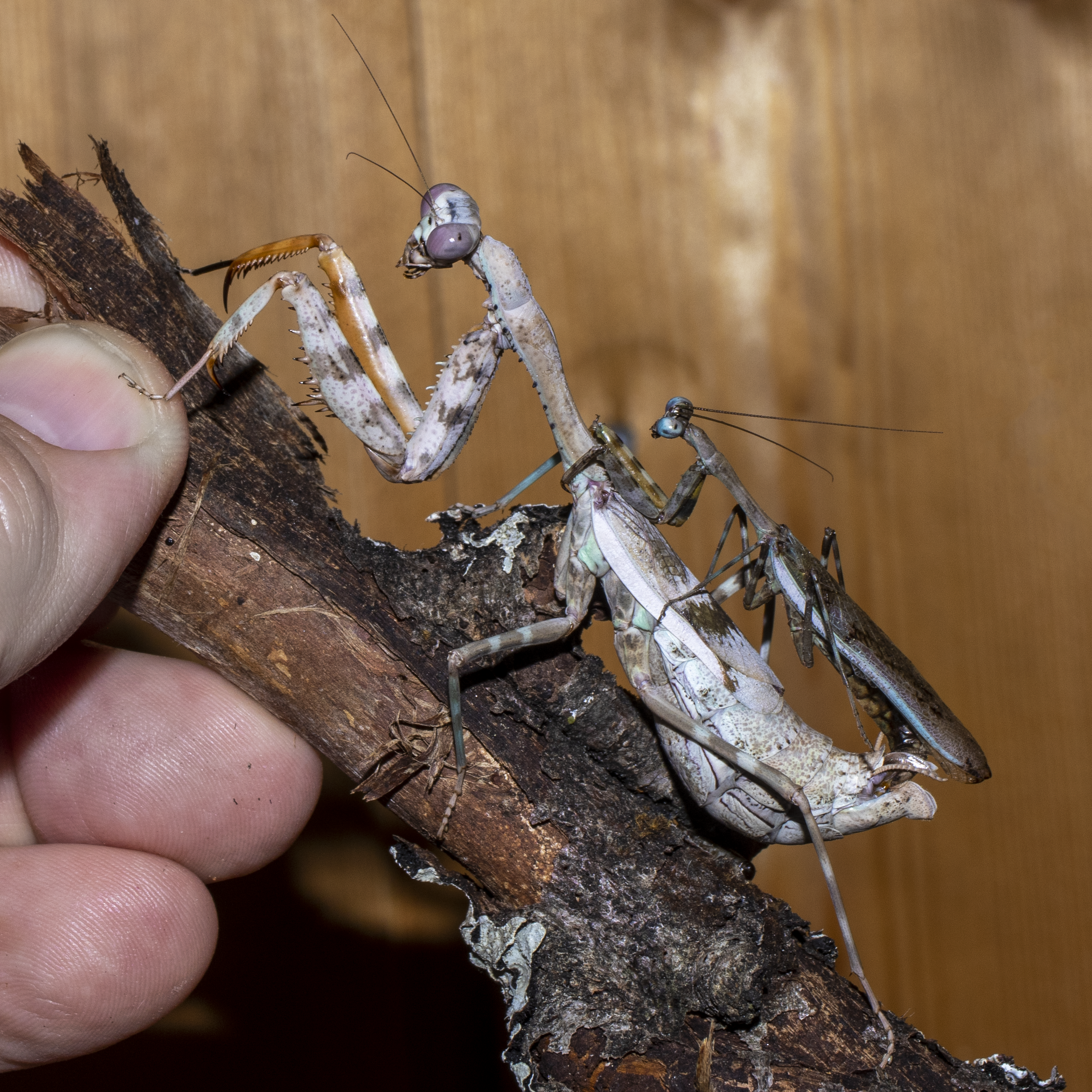
- Parasphendale affinis

Scientific classification
- Kingdom: Animalia
- Phylum: Arthropoda
- Clade: Pancrustacea
- Class: Insecta
- Order: Mantodea
- Family: Miomantidae
- Subfamily: Miomantinae
- Genus: Parasphendale; Schulthess-Schildler, 1898

= Parasphendale =

Genus of praying mantises

Parasphendale is a genus of mantis in the family Miomantidae, found in East Africa. All of the members of this genus are known as budwing mantises, due to their short wings in females.

== Species ==
The following species are recognized in the genus Parasphendale:

- Parasphendale affinis Giglio-Tos, 1915
- Parasphendale africana Giglio-Tos, 1915
- Parasphendale agrionina Gerstaecker, 1869 (The type species)
- Parasphendale albicosta Chopard, 1938
- Parasphendale arabukosokokei Borer & Ehrmann, 2022
- Parasphendale costalis Kirby, 1904
- Parasphendale ghindana Giglio-Tos, 1915
- Parasphendale gracilicollis Beier, 1930
- Parasphendale minor Schulthess-Schildler, 1898
- Parasphendale scioana Giglio-Tos, 1915
- Parasphendale stali Sjostedt, 1930
- Parasphendale vincta Gerstaecker, 1869
