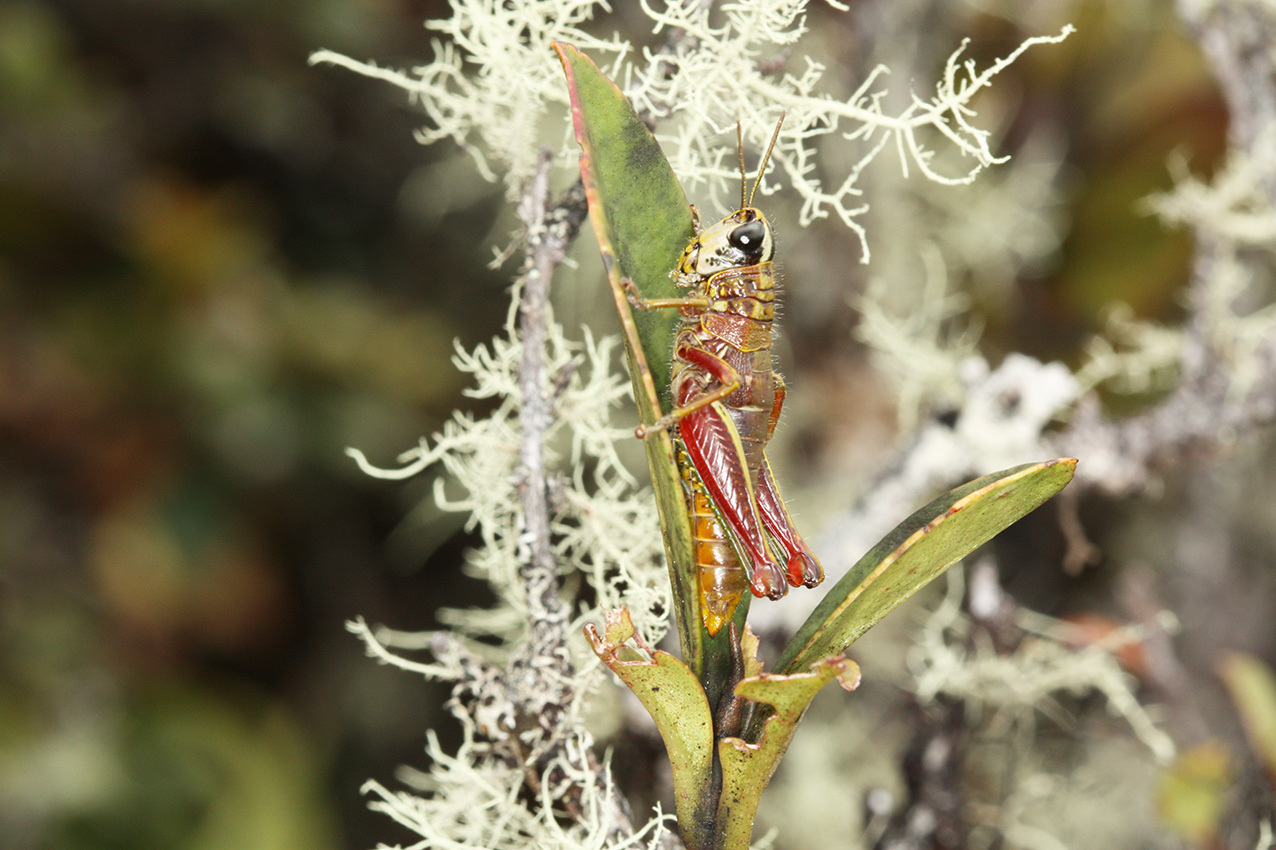
- Jivarus ronderosi, Ecuador

Scientific classification
- Kingdom: Animalia
- Phylum: Arthropoda
- Clade: Pancrustacea
- Class: Insecta
- Order: Orthoptera
- Suborder: Caelifera
- Family: Acrididae
- Subfamily: Melanoplinae
- Tribe: Jivarini
- Genus: Jivarus
- Species: J. ronderosi

Binomial name
- Jivarus ronderosi Cigliano & Amédégnato, 2010

= Jivarus ronderosi =

Species of spur-throated grasshopper

Jivarus ronderosi is a species of spur-throated grasshopper in the family Acrididae. It is found in Ecuador.
