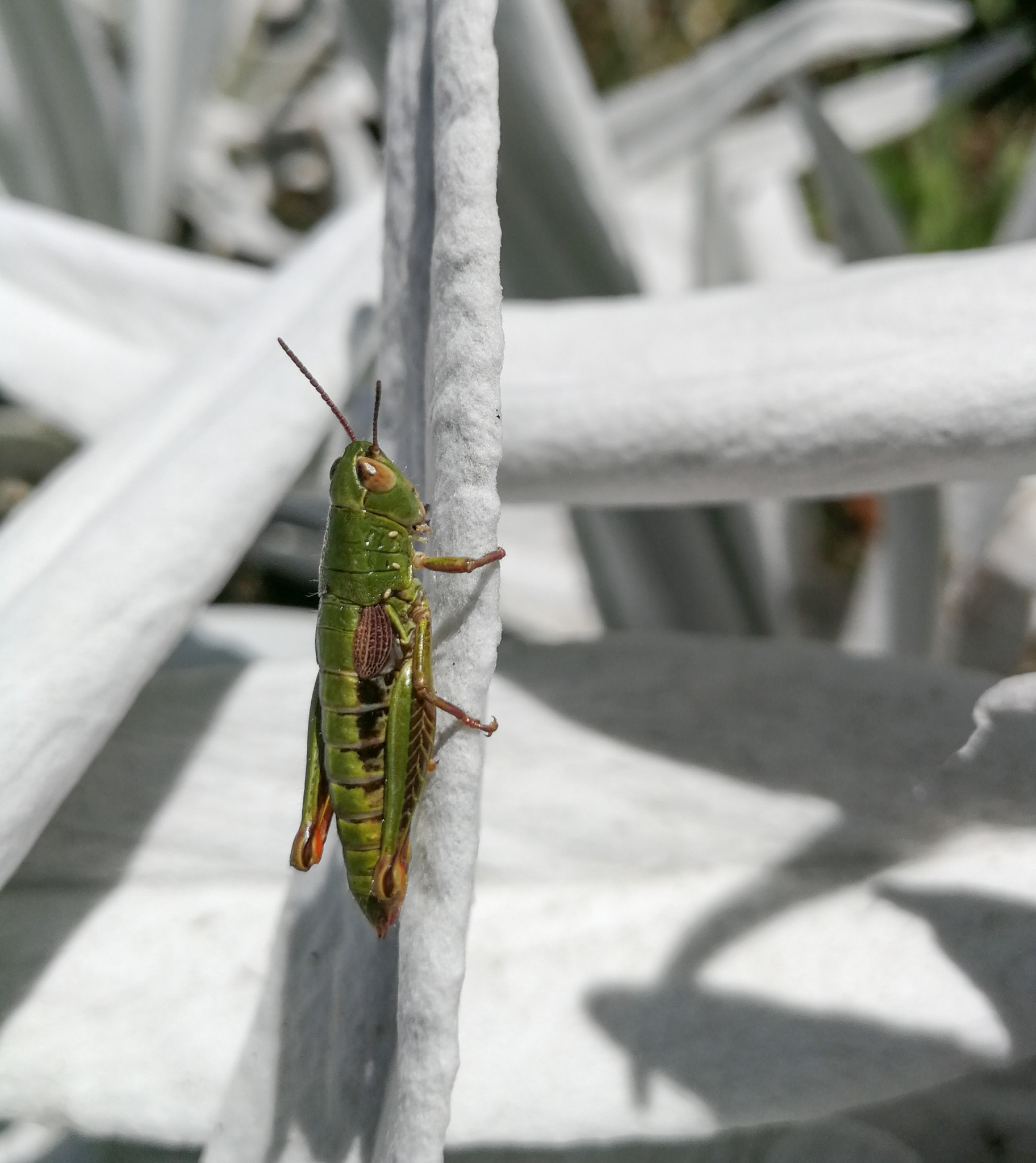
- Jivarus antisanae, Ecuador

Scientific classification
- Domain: Eukaryota
- Kingdom: Animalia
- Phylum: Arthropoda
- Class: Insecta
- Order: Orthoptera
- Suborder: Caelifera
- Family: Acrididae
- Subfamily: Melanoplinae
- Tribe: Jivarini
- Genus: Jivarus
- Species: J. antisanae

Binomial name
- Jivarus antisanae (Bolívar, 1881)

Synonyms
- Pezotettix antisanae Bolívar, 1881

= Jivarus antisanae =

Species of spur-throated grasshopper

Jivarus antisanae is a species of spur-throated grasshopper in the family Acrididae. It is found in Ecuador.
