= Cilnia =

- Adult female Cilnia humeralis

Scientific classification
- Kingdom: Animalia
- Phylum: Arthropoda
- Clade: Pancrustacea
- Class: Insecta
- Order: Mantodea
- Family: Miomantidae
- Subfamily: Miomantinae
- Tribe: Miomantini
- Genus: Cilnia; Stål, 1876

Species
- Cilnia chopardi (Werner, 1927); Cilnia humeralis (Saussure, 1871)

Synonyms
- Leomantis (Rehn, 1903)

Genus of praying mantises

Cilnia is a genus of praying mantises in the family Miomantidae that is native to Africa.

The genus Cilnia contains two species:

- Cilnia chopardi
- Cilnia humeralis

== See also ==
- List of mantis genera and species
