= Chaetona piliseta =

Scientific classification
- Kingdom: Animalia
- Phylum: Arthropoda
- Class: Insecta
- Order: Diptera
- Family: Tachinidae
- Subfamily: Exoristinae
- Tribe: Blondeliini
- Genus: Chaetona
- Species: C. piliseta

Binomial name
- Chaetona piliseta (Wulp, 1890)

Synonyms
- Masicera piliseta Wulp, 1890

Species of fly

Chaetona piliseta is a species of fly in the family Tachinidae.

== Distribution ==
Mexico.
