= Scotiptera gagatea =

Scientific classification
- Kingdom: Animalia
- Phylum: Arthropoda
- Class: Insecta
- Order: Diptera
- Family: Tachinidae
- Subfamily: Dexiinae
- Tribe: Dexiini
- Genus: Scotiptera
- Species: S. gagatea

Binomial name
- Scotiptera gagatea (Robineau-Desvoidy, 1830)

Synonyms
- Sophia gagatea Robineau-Desvoidy, 1830

Species of fly

Scotiptera gagatea is a species of fly in the family Tachinidae.

== Distribution ==
Brazil.
