= Chaetona tuchucheensis =

Scientific classification
- Kingdom: Animalia
- Phylum: Arthropoda
- Class: Insecta
- Order: Diptera
- Family: Tachinidae
- Subfamily: Exoristinae
- Tribe: Blondeliini
- Genus: Chaetona
- Species: C. tuchucheensis

Binomial name
- Chaetona tuchucheensis Thompson, 1968

Species of fly

Chaetona tuchucheensis is a species of fly in the family Tachinidae.

== Distribution ==
Trinidad.
