= Jurinia pompalis =

Scientific classification
- Kingdom: Animalia
- Phylum: Arthropoda
- Class: Insecta
- Order: Diptera
- Family: Tachinidae
- Subfamily: Tachininae
- Tribe: Tachinini
- Genus: Jurinia
- Species: J. pompalis

Binomial name
- Jurinia pompalis (Reinhard, 1941)

Synonyms
- Archytas currani Ouellet, 1942; Exopalpus pompalis Reinhard, 1941

Species of fly

Jurinia pompalis is a species of bristle fly in the family Tachinidae.

== Distribution ==
Canada, United States.
