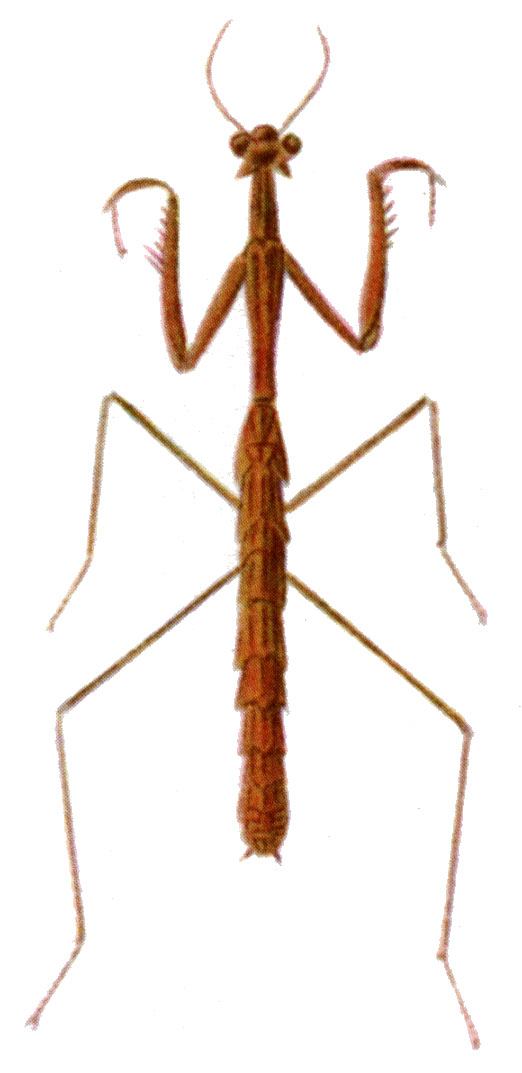
- Hoplocorypha macra

Scientific classification
- Kingdom: Animalia
- Phylum: Arthropoda
- Clade: Pancrustacea
- Class: Insecta
- Order: Mantodea
- Family: Hoplocoryphidae
- Genus: Hoplocorypha; Stal, 1871

= Hoplocorypha =

Genus of insects

Hoplocorypha is a genus of mantises belonging to the family Thespidae.

The species of this genus are found in Africa.

Species:

- Hoplocorypha acuta Giglio-Tos, 1916
- Hoplocorypha bicornis Deeleman-Reinhold, 1957
- Hoplocorypha boromensis Brancsik, 1895
- Hoplocorypha bottegi Saussure, 1895
- Hoplocorypha boviformis Rehn, 1912
- Hoplocorypha brevicollis Beier, 1931
- Hoplocorypha cacomana Giglio-Tos, 1916
- Hoplocorypha carli Giglio-Tos, 1916
- Hoplocorypha congica Giglio-Tos, 1916
- Hoplocorypha dentata Giglio-Tos, 1916
- Hoplocorypha distinguenda Beier, 1930
- Hoplocorypha foliata Giglio-Tos, 1916
- Hoplocorypha fumosa Giglio-Tos, 1916
- Hoplocorypha galeata Saussure, 1870
- Hoplocorypha garuana Giglio-Tos, 1916
- Hoplocorypha hamulifera Beier, 1954
- Hoplocorypha lacualis Giglio-Tos, 1916
- Hoplocorypha lobata Roy, 1969
- Hoplocorypha macra Stal, 1856
- Hoplocorypha mellea Giglio-Tos, 1916
- Hoplocorypha montana Giglio-Tos, 1913
- Hoplocorypha nana Sjostedt, 1909
- Hoplocorypha narocana Giglio-Tos, 1916
- Hoplocorypha nigerica Beier, 1930
- Hoplocorypha nigra Giglio-Tos, 1916
- Hoplocorypha perplexa Rehn, 1912
- Hoplocorypha picea Giglio-Tos, 1916
- Hoplocorypha punctata Giglio-Tos, 1916
- Hoplocorypha rapax Saussure, 1881
- Hoplocorypha salfii La Greca, 1939
- Hoplocorypha saussurii Giglio-Tos, 1916
- Hoplocorypha sordida Giglio-Tos, 1916
- Hoplocorypha striata Beier, 1930
- Hoplocorypha turneri Beier, 1930
- Hoplocorypha ugandana Beier, 1930
- Hoplocorypha vittata Giglio-Tos, 1916
- Hoplocorypha wittei Beier, 1954
