= Chaetona longiseta =

Scientific classification
- Kingdom: Animalia
- Phylum: Arthropoda
- Class: Insecta
- Order: Diptera
- Family: Tachinidae
- Subfamily: Exoristinae
- Tribe: Blondeliini
- Genus: Chaetona
- Species: C. longiseta

Binomial name
- Chaetona longiseta (Wiedemann, 1830)

Synonyms
- Dexia longiseta Wiedemann, 1830

Species of fly

Chaetona longiseta is a species of fly in the family Tachinidae.

== Distribution ==
Brazil.
