= Scotiptera venatoria =

Scientific classification
- Kingdom: Animalia
- Phylum: Arthropoda
- Class: Insecta
- Order: Diptera
- Family: Tachinidae
- Subfamily: Dexiinae
- Tribe: Dexiini
- Genus: Scotiptera
- Species: S. venatoria

Binomial name
- Scotiptera venatoria (Fabricius, 1805)

Synonyms
- Dexia melaleuca Wiedemann, 1830; Musca venatoria Fabricius, 1805; Sophia punctata Robineau-Desvoidy, 1830; Sophia vittata Guerin, 1831

Species of fly

Scotiptera venatoria is a species of fly in the family Tachinidae.

== Distribution ==
Guatemala, Panama, Brazil, Guyana.
