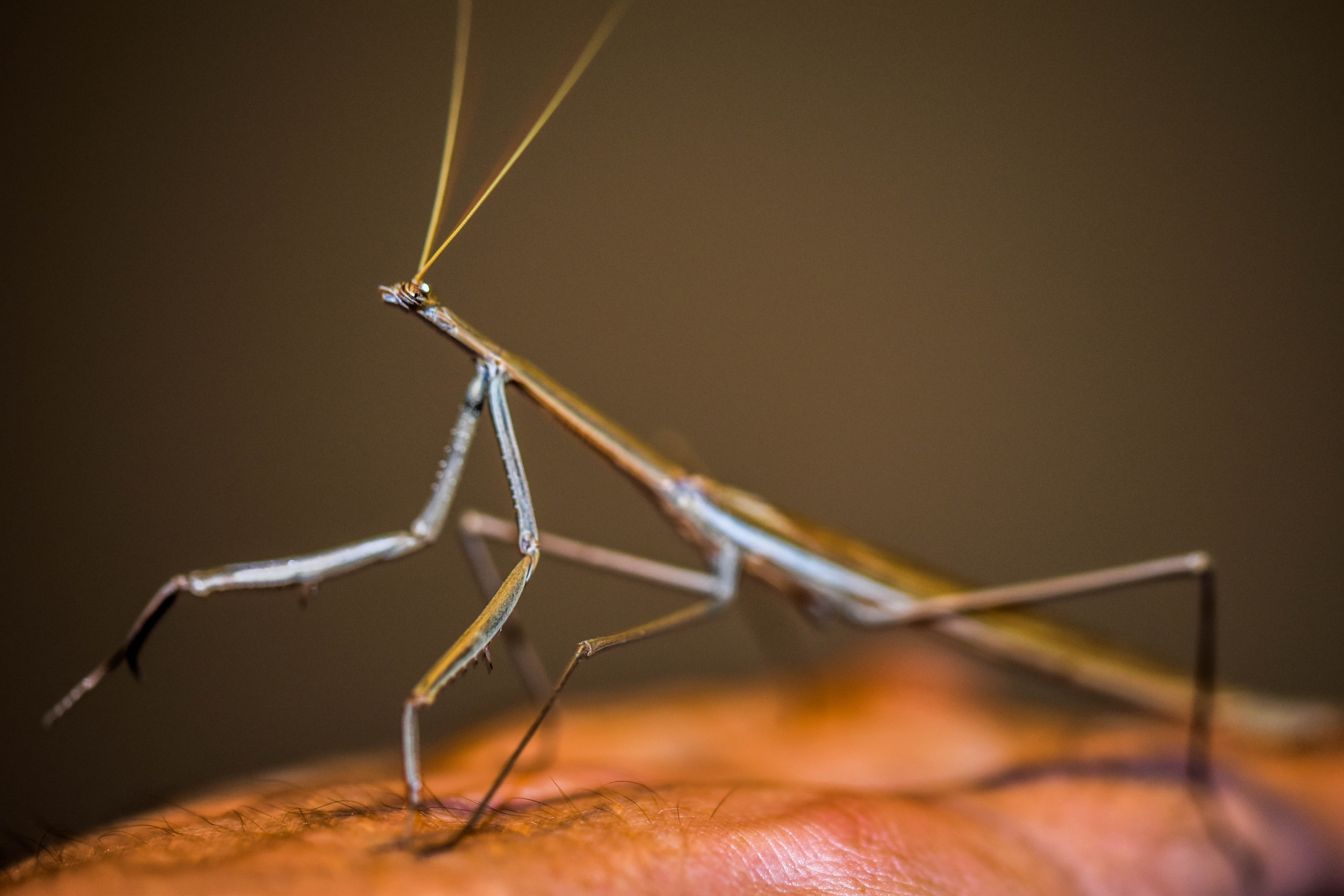
- Hoplocoryphella grandis

Scientific classification
- Kingdom: Animalia
- Phylum: Arthropoda
- Clade: Pancrustacea
- Class: Insecta
- Order: Mantodea
- Clade: Pareumantodea
- Superfamily: Hoplocoryphoidea; Giglio-Tos, 1916
- Family: Hoplocoryphidae; Giglio-Tos, 1916

= Hoplocoryphidae =

Family of praying mantises

Hoplocoryphidae is a family of praying mantids, based on the type genus Hoplocorypha. As part of a major revision of mantid taxonomy, genera have been moved here from the subfamily Hoplocoryphinae of the previously polyphyletic family Thespidae. The family Hoplocoryphidae is the only member of superfamily Hoplocoryphoidea. Species in this family have been recorded from tropical Africa.

== Genera ==
The Mantodea Species File lists:

- Apterocorypha Roy, 1966
- Hoplocorypha Stal, 1871
- Hoplocoryphella Giglio-Tos, 1916

== See also ==
- List of mantis genera and species
