= Ermanno Giglio-Tos =

Italian entomologist

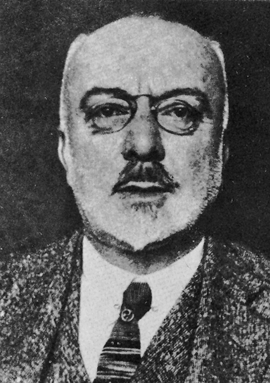

Ermanno Giglio-Tos (25 March 1865 – 18 August 1926) was an Italian entomologist.

Giglio-Tos was born at Chiaverano, Turin, and studied at the University of Turin from 1886 until 1896 under Michele Lessona. Later he was a professor at the University of Cagliari. He specialised in Diptera, Mantodea, Phasmatodea, Orthoptera and Blattodea. His collections are in the Turin Museum of Natural History. He died, aged 61, in his home city of Turin.

== Publications ==
Partial list

- Ditteri del Messico, 4 Volumes, Turin 1892–1895
- Les problèmes de la vie. Essai d'une interprétation scientifique des phénomènes vitaux, 4 Bände, Turin 1900–1910
- Publisher of the magazine Biologica: Raccolta di scritti di Biologia, 1908
- Una grave minaccia per Cagliari : la bonifica dello stagno di Santa Gilla proposta dall'ing. Conti-Vecchi. Cagliari 1920
