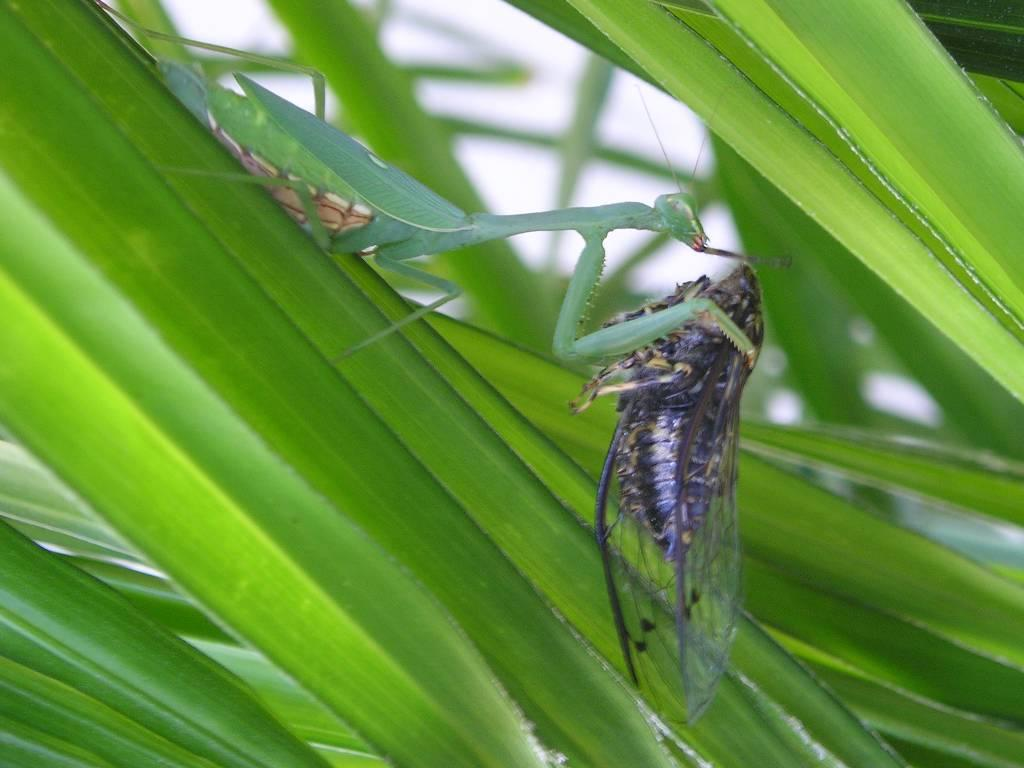
- Miomantis caffra eating a cicada

Scientific classification
- Kingdom: Animalia
- Phylum: Arthropoda
- Clade: Pancrustacea
- Class: Insecta
- Order: Mantodea
- Family: Miomantidae
- Subfamily: Miomantinae
- Tribe: Miomantini
- Genus: Miomantis; Saussure, 1870

Species
- See Text

Synonyms
- Calidomantis Rehn, 1901; Oreomantis Uvarov, 1935

= Miomantis =

Genus of praying mantises

Miomantis is a genus of praying mantis in the subfamily Miomantinae.

== Species ==
See List of Miomantis species

== See also ==
- List of mantis genera and species
