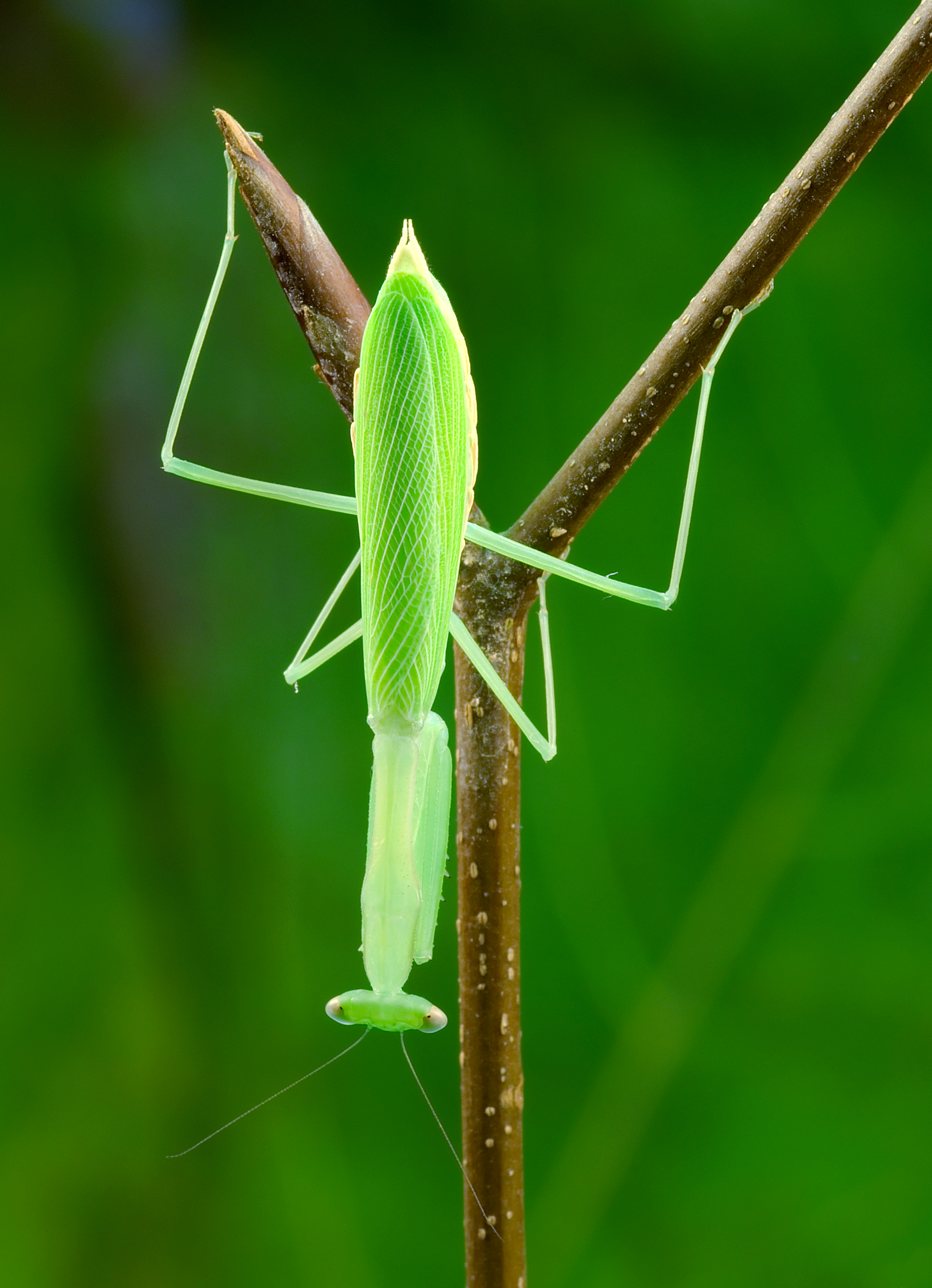
- Adult female Miomantis paykullii

Scientific classification
- Kingdom: Animalia
- Phylum: Arthropoda
- Clade: Pancrustacea
- Class: Insecta
- Order: Mantodea
- Superfamily: Miomantoidea; Westwood, 1889
- Family: Miomantidae; Westwood, 1889a

Genera
- See text

= Miomantidae =

Subfamily of praying mantises

Miomantidae is a family of praying mantises in the order Mantodea.

The species are mostly found in western and central Africa and similar in characteristics and behaviour to other mantids.

== Taxonomy ==
The Mantodea Species File lists two subfamilies and seven genera:

=== Subfamily Miomantinae ===
- Cilnia Stal, 1876
- Miomantis Saussure, 1870
- Neocilnia Beier, 1930
- Paracilnia Werner, 1909
- Parasphendale Schulthess-Schildler, 1898
- Taumantis Giglio-Tos, 1917

=== Subfamily Solygiinae ===
- Solygia Stal, 1877
