= Bark mantis =

Common name for several praying mantises

Bark mantis is a common name given to various species of praying mantis, especially those with cryptic camouflage resembling tree bark. Examples include:

- Gyromantis kraussii (spiny bark mantis)
- Gyromantis occidentalis (eastern bark mantis)
- Paraoxypilus sp. (boxer bark mantises)
- Tarachodes sp. (Afrotropical bark mantises)
- Theopompa sp. (Asian bark mantises)

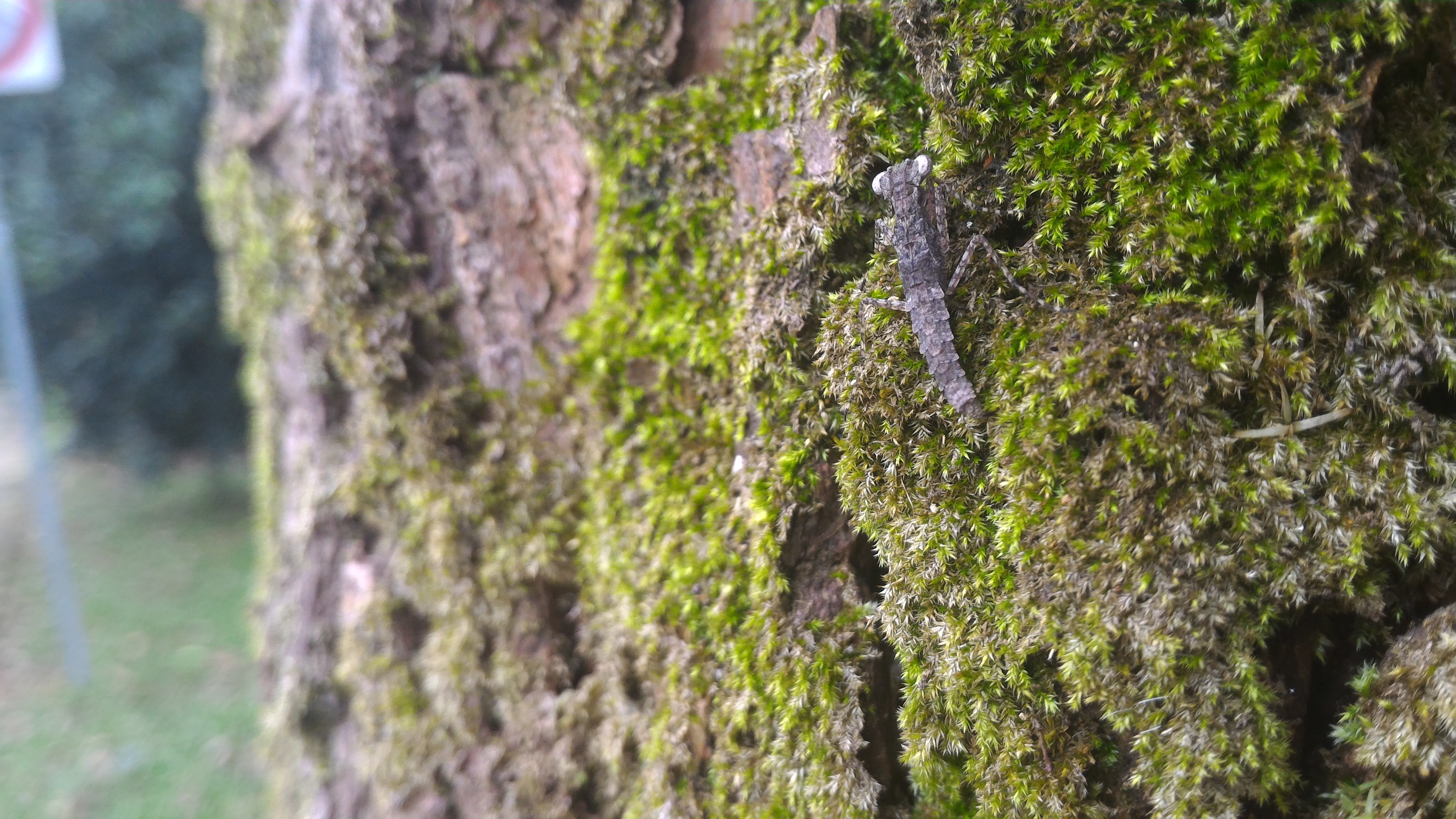
Bark mantis

== See also ==
- Dead leaf mantis
- Flower mantis
- Grass mantis
- Leaf mantis
- Shield mantis
- Stick mantis
- List of mantis genera and species
