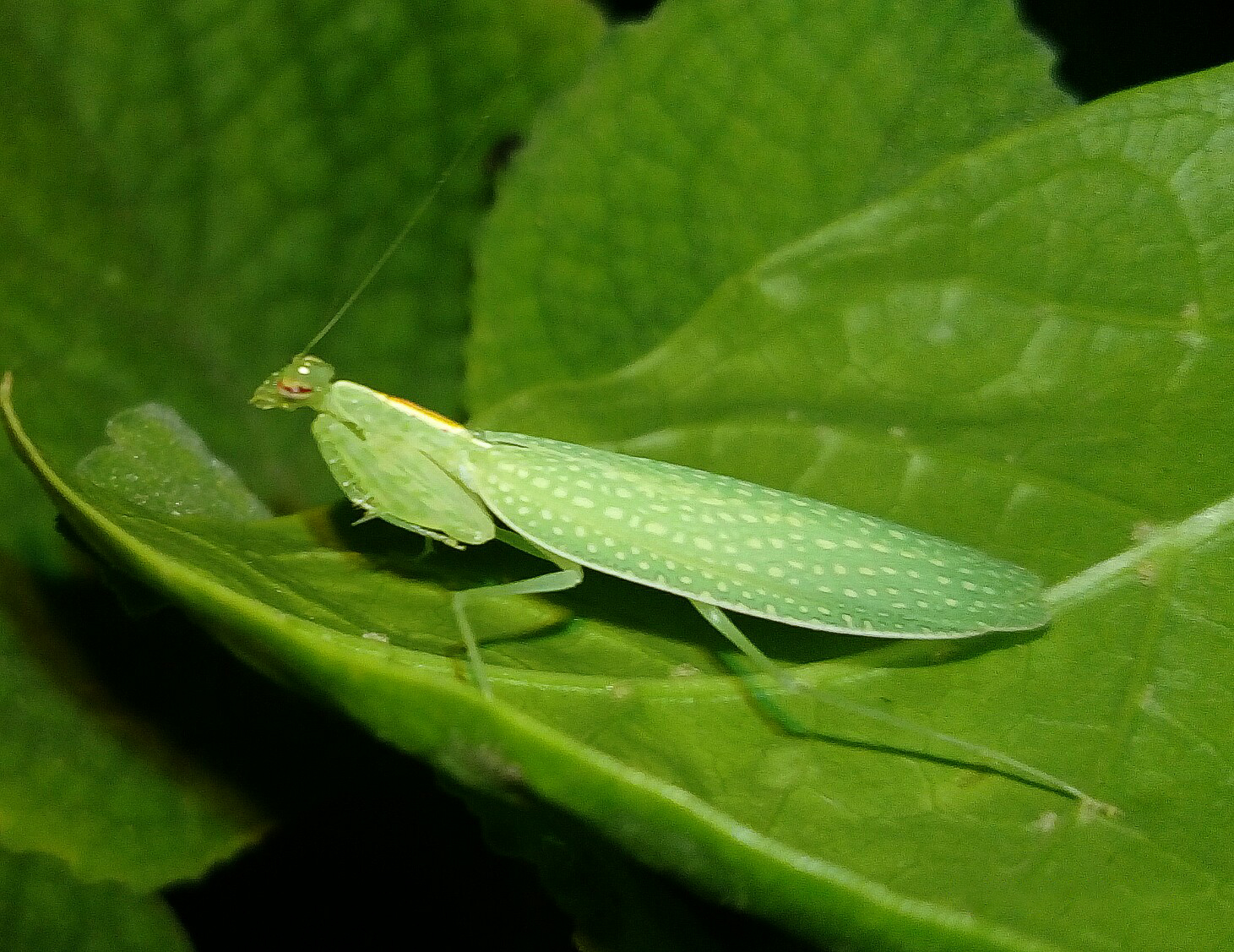

Scientific classification
- Kingdom: Animalia
- Phylum: Arthropoda
- Clade: Pancrustacea
- Class: Insecta
- Order: Mantodea
- Family: Nanomantidae
- Subfamily: Tropidomantinae
- Genus: Eomantis
- Species: E. guttatipennis

Binomial name
- Eomantis guttatipennis Stål, 1877

Synonyms
- Tropidomantis guttatipennis Stål, 1877

= Eomantis guttatipennis =

Species of praying mantis

Eomantis guttatipennis is a species of praying mantis in the family Nanomantidae. It is the type species of the genus Eomantis, having previously been placed in Tropidomantis. This species has been recorded from India, Nepal, Tibet, Myanmar and Vietnam.
