= Cliomantis cornuta =

Scientific classification
- Kingdom: Animalia
- Phylum: Arthropoda
- Class: Insecta
- Order: Mantodea
- Family: Nanomantidae
- Genus: Cliomantis
- Species: C. cornuta

Binomial name
- Cliomantis cornuta Giglio-Tos, 1913

Species of praying mantis

Cliomantis cornuta is a species of praying mantis in the family Nanomantidae.

== See also ==
- List of mantis genera and species
