= Melania (disambiguation) =

Melania is a feminine given name. Melania may also refer to:

== Places ==
- Melania (Amorgos), an ancient town of Amorgos, Greece
- Mount Melania, Ross Archipelago, Antarctica
- Melania Ridge, Ross Archipelago, Antarctica

== Biology ==
- Melania (gastropod), a former name of the Thiara genus of gastropods
- Melania (moth), a former name of the Siccia genus of moths

== Other ==
- Melania (memoir), a 2024 memoir by Melania Trump
- Melania (film), a 2026 American documentary about Melania Trump
- $Melania, a meme coin associated with United States first lady Melania Trump

== See also ==
- Phthersigena melania, a species of praying mantis native to Australia
- Phyllomacromia melania, a species of dragonfly in family Corduliidae
- Red-rimmed melania, a small freshwater snail with an operculum, in the family Thiaridae
