= Nanomantini =

Scientific classification
- Kingdom: Animalia
- Phylum: Arthropoda
- Clade: Pancrustacea
- Class: Insecta
- Order: Mantodea
- Family: Nanomantidae
- Subfamily: Nanomantinae
- Tribe: Nanomantini

Tribe of praying mantises

Nanomantini is a tribe of Asian mantises in the new (2019) family Nanomantidae. There are about 6 genera and 10 described species in Nanomantini.

== Genera ==
These genera belong to the tribe Nanomantini:

- Nanomantis Saussure, 1871
- Parananomantis Mukherjee, 1995 (monotypic)
- Sceptuchus Hebard, 1920
