= Bolbe pallida =

Scientific classification
- Kingdom: Animalia
- Phylum: Arthropoda
- Clade: Pancrustacea
- Class: Insecta
- Order: Mantodea
- Family: Nanomantidae
- Genus: Bolbe
- Species: B. pallida

Binomial name
- Bolbe pallida Tindale, 1923

Species of praying mantis

Bolbe pallida is a species of praying mantis in the family Nanomantidae. It is endemic to Australia.

== See also ==
- List of Australian stick insects and mantids
- Mantises of Oceania
- List of mantis genera and species
