= Phthersigena =

- Phthersigena conspersa

Scientific classification
- Kingdom: Animalia
- Phylum: Arthropoda
- Clade: Pancrustacea
- Class: Insecta
- Order: Mantodea
- Family: Nanomantidae
- Subfamily: Fulciniinae
- Genus: Phthersigena; Stal, 1871

Genus of praying mantises

Phthersigena is an Australasian genus of praying mantids: in the subfamily Fulciniinae and tribe Paraoxypilini. It is one of several genera containing certain species called "unicorn mantids", due to a process on their heads.

== Species ==
The Mantodea Species File lists:

subgenus Glabromantis Sjostedt, 1918

- Phthersigena minor Sjostedt, 1918
- Phthersigena nebulosa Sjostedt, 1918

subgenus Phthersigena Stal, 1871

- Phthersigena centralis Giglio-Tos, 1915
- Phthersigena conspersa Stal, 1871 - type species
- Phthersigena insularis Beier, 1965
- Phthersigena melania Tindale, 1923
- Phthersigena pallidifemur Tindale, 1923
- Phthersigena timorensis Beier, 1952
- Phthersigena unicornis Tindale, 1923
