= Hapalomantis minima =

Scientific classification
- Kingdom: Animalia
- Phylum: Arthropoda
- Clade: Pancrustacea
- Class: Insecta
- Order: Mantodea
- Family: Nanomantidae
- Genus: Hapalomantis
- Species: H. minima

Binomial name
- Hapalomantis minima (Werner, 1906)

Synonyms
- Entella minima Werner, 1906

Species of praying mantis

Hapalomantis minima is a species of mantis in the family Nanomantidae. This mantis is native to East Africa. A record from Angola is erraneous.

The holotype is a male measuring 16.5 mm (0.65 in) in length.
