= Metoxypilus werneri =

Scientific classification
- Domain: Eukaryota
- Kingdom: Animalia
- Phylum: Arthropoda
- Class: Insecta
- Order: Mantodea
- Family: Nanomantidae
- Genus: Metoxypilus
- Species: M. werneri

Binomial name
- Metoxypilus werneri Beier, 1929

Species of praying mantis

Metoxypilus werneri is a species of praying mantis found in New Guinea.

== See also ==
- List of mantis genera and species
