= Phthersigena unicornis =

Scientific classification
- Domain: Eukaryota
- Kingdom: Animalia
- Phylum: Arthropoda
- Class: Insecta
- Order: Mantodea
- Family: Nanomantidae
- Subfamily: Fulciniinae
- Genus: Phthersigena
- Species: P. unicornis

Binomial name
- Phthersigena unicornis Tindale, 1923

Species of praying mantis

Phthersigena unicornis is a species of praying mantis native to Australia.

== See also ==
- List of mantis genera and species
- Unicorn mantis
