= Bolbula debilis =

Scientific classification
- Kingdom: Animalia
- Phylum: Arthropoda
- Class: Insecta
- Order: Mantodea
- Family: Nanomantidae
- Genus: Bolbula
- Species: B. debilis

Binomial name
- Bolbula debilis Giglio-Tos, 1915

Species of praying mantis

Bolbula debilis is a species of praying mantis in the family Nanomantidae. This species is known for its slender body and agile movements, which are characteristic of mantises in this family. Bolbula debilis is typically found in tropical and subtropical regions, where it inhabits vegetation and preys on a variety of insects. Like other mantises, it is a sit-and-wait predator, relying on its excellent camouflage and swift reflexes to capture prey. The species contributes to the ecological balance by controlling pest populations and serving as prey for larger animals.

== See also ==
- List of mantis genera and species
