= Ciulfina klassi =

Scientific classification
- Domain: Eukaryota
- Kingdom: Animalia
- Phylum: Arthropoda
- Class: Insecta
- Order: Mantodea
- Family: Nanomantidae
- Genus: Ciulfina
- Species: C. klassi

Binomial name
- Ciulfina klassi Holwell, Ginn & Herberstein, 2007

Species of praying mantis

Ciulfina klassi is a species of praying mantis in the family Nanomantidae. C. klassi mantises are endemic to the forests of Northeastern Australia, preferring narrow trees with smooth bark.

== See also ==
- List of mantis genera and species
