= Ciulfina biseriata =

Scientific classification
- Domain: Eukaryota
- Kingdom: Animalia
- Phylum: Arthropoda
- Class: Insecta
- Order: Mantodea
- Family: Nanomantidae
- Genus: Ciulfina
- Species: C. biseriata

Binomial name
- Ciulfina biseriata Westwood, 1889

Synonyms
- Ciulfina brevis Werner, 1912

Species of praying mantis

Ciulfina biseriata is a species of praying mantis in the family Nanomantidae.

== See also ==
- List of mantis genera and species
