= Metoxypilus lobifrons =

Scientific classification
- Domain: Eukaryota
- Kingdom: Animalia
- Phylum: Arthropoda
- Class: Insecta
- Order: Mantodea
- Family: Nanomantidae
- Genus: Metoxypilus
- Species: M. lobifrons

Binomial name
- Metoxypilus lobifrons Stal, 1877

Species of praying mantis

Metoxypilus lobifrons is a species of praying mantis in the family Nanomantidae.

== See also ==
- List of mantis genera and species
