= Calofulcinia elegans =

Scientific classification
- Kingdom: Animalia
- Phylum: Arthropoda
- Clade: Pancrustacea
- Class: Insecta
- Order: Mantodea
- Family: Nanomantidae
- Genus: Calofulcinia
- Species: C. elegans

Binomial name
- Calofulcinia elegans Giglio-Tos, 1915

Synonyms
- Calofulcinia chloeon Werner, 1928

Species of praying mantis

Calofulcinia elegans is a species of praying mantis in the family Nanomantidae. It is found in New Guinea.
