= Phthersigena insularis =

Scientific classification
- Domain: Eukaryota
- Kingdom: Animalia
- Phylum: Arthropoda
- Class: Insecta
- Order: Mantodea
- Family: Nanomantidae
- Subfamily: Fulciniinae
- Genus: Phthersigena
- Species: P. insularis

Binomial name
- Phthersigena insularis Beier, 1965

Species of praying mantis

Phthersigena insularis is a species of praying mantis native to Australia.

== See also ==
- List of mantis genera and species
