= Bolbula widenmanni =

Scientific classification
- Domain: Eukaryota
- Kingdom: Animalia
- Phylum: Arthropoda
- Class: Insecta
- Order: Mantodea
- Family: Nanomantidae
- Genus: Bolbula
- Species: B. widenmanni

Binomial name
- Bolbula widenmanni Werner, 1906

Species of praying mantis

Bolbula widenmanni is a species of praying mantis in the family Nanomantidae.

== See also ==
- List of mantis genera and species
