= Ciulfina liturgusa =

Scientific classification
- Kingdom: Animalia
- Phylum: Arthropoda
- Class: Insecta
- Order: Mantodea
- Family: Nanomantidae
- Genus: Ciulfina
- Species: C. liturgusa

Binomial name
- Ciulfina liturgusa Giglio-Tos, 1915

Species of praying mantis

Ciulfina liturgusa is a species of praying mantis in the family Nanomantidae.

== See also ==
- List of mantis genera and species
