= Metoxypilus costalis =

Scientific classification
- Domain: Eukaryota
- Kingdom: Animalia
- Phylum: Arthropoda
- Class: Insecta
- Order: Mantodea
- Family: Nanomantidae
- Genus: Metoxypilus
- Species: M. costalis

Binomial name
- Metoxypilus costalis Westwood, 1889

Synonyms
- Metoxypilus spinosus Giglio-Tos, 1913

Species of praying mantis

Metoxypilus costalis is a species of praying mantis in the family Nanomantidae.

== See also ==
- List of mantis genera and species
