= Ilomantis ginsburgae =

Scientific classification
- Kingdom: Animalia
- Phylum: Arthropoda
- Class: Insecta
- Order: Mantodea
- Family: Nanomantidae
- Genus: Ilomantis
- Species: I. ginsburgae

Binomial name
- Ilomantis ginsburgae Brannoch & Svenson, 2016

Species of praying mantis

Ilomantis ginsburgae is a species of leaf-dwelling praying mantis from Madagascar. It is the first praying mantis species characterised by its female genitalia. It was named after United States Supreme Court Justice Ruth Bader Ginsburg for her "commitment to women's rights and gender equality" and for her custom of wearing a jabot, a frilly neckwear which resembles the insect's neck plate.
