= Phthersigena minor =

Scientific classification
- Domain: Eukaryota
- Kingdom: Animalia
- Phylum: Arthropoda
- Class: Insecta
- Order: Mantodea
- Family: Nanomantidae
- Genus: Phthersigena
- Species: P. minor

Binomial name
- Phthersigena minor Sjöstedt, 1918

Species of praying mantis

Phthersigena minor is a species of praying mantis native to Australia.

== See also ==
- List of mantis genera and species
