= Bolbena hottentotta =

Scientific classification
- Kingdom: Animalia
- Phylum: Arthropoda
- Clade: Pancrustacea
- Class: Insecta
- Order: Mantodea
- Family: Nanomantidae
- Genus: Bolbena
- Species: B. hottentotta

Binomial name
- Bolbena hottentotta (Karny, 1908)

Species of praying mantis

Bolbena hottentotta, common name hottentot mantis, is a species of praying mantis found in Angola, Kenya, and Namibia. It is a tiny mantis species in which nymphs are only about 2.5 millimetres (0.1 in) long and adult females grow to only 15 mm (0.6 in) long. This species has recently been introduced to cultivation but are still very rare and are raised by only a handful of breeders.

== See also ==
- List of mantis genera and species
