= B. exigua =

B. exigua may refer to:

- Balearica exigua, an extinct crane
- Boa exigua, a South American snake
- Bolbula exigua, a praying mantis
- Brocchinia exigua, a sea snail
- Bromelia exigua, a flowering plant
