= Ciulfina rentzi =

Scientific classification
- Domain: Eukaryota
- Kingdom: Animalia
- Phylum: Arthropoda
- Class: Insecta
- Order: Mantodea
- Family: Nanomantidae
- Genus: Ciulfina
- Species: C. rentzi

Binomial name
- Ciulfina rentzi Holwell, Ginn & Herberstein, 2007

Species of praying mantis

Ciulfina rentzi is a species of praying mantis in the family Nanomantidae.

== See also ==
- List of mantis genera and species
