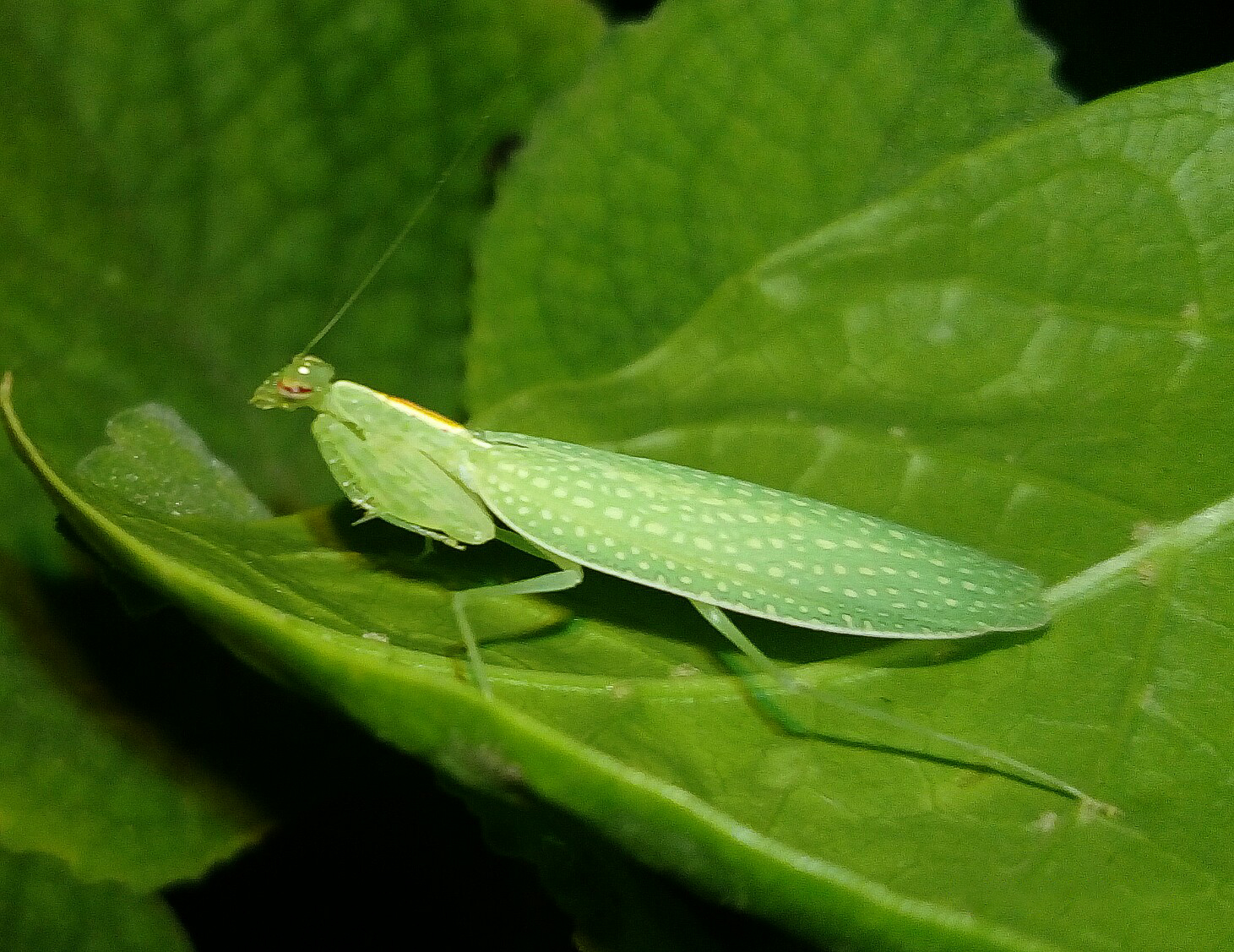
- Eomantis guttatipennis (previously placed in Tropidomantis)

Scientific classification
- Kingdom: Animalia
- Phylum: Arthropoda
- Clade: Pancrustacea
- Class: Insecta
- Order: Mantodea
- Family: Nanomantidae
- Subfamily: Tropidomantinae

= Tropidomantinae =

Subfamily of praying mantises

Tropidomantinae is a subfamily of mantises in the new (2019) family Nanomantidae. Within the single tribe Tropidomantini there are six genera, distributed in Asia and the Pacific.

== Tribes and Genera ==
The Mantodea Species File lists two tribes:

- tribe Epsomantini (monotypic)
  - Epsomantis Giglio-Tos, 1915 (monotypic)
- tribe Tropidomantini
  - Eomantis Giglio-Tos, 1915
  - Oligocanthopus Beier, 1935 - monotypic O. ornata
  - Pliacanthopus Giglio-Tos, 1927 (synonym Xanthomantis Giglio-Tos, 1915)
  - Sinomantis Beier, 1933 - monotypic S. denticulata
  - Tropidomantis Stal, 1877

NB: Several genera, previously placed here, have now been moved to the Fulciniinae, Hapalomantinae and Nanomantinae.
