= Tropidomantis kawaharai =

Scientific classification
- Kingdom: Animalia
- Phylum: Arthropoda
- Clade: Pancrustacea
- Class: Insecta
- Order: Mantodea
- Family: Nanomantidae
- Genus: Tropidomantis
- Species: T. kawaharai

Binomial name
- Tropidomantis kawaharai Brannoch, 2018

Species of praying mantis

Tropidomantis kawaharai is a species of praying mantis in the family Nanomantidae. It is endemic to the remote Marquesas Islands of French Polynesia in the southern Pacific Ocean. It was described from two specimens collected from the island of Hiva Oa. It is notable for being the first praying mantis species known from the archipelago.
