= Bolbena minutissima =

Scientific classification
- Kingdom: Animalia
- Phylum: Arthropoda
- Clade: Pancrustacea
- Class: Insecta
- Order: Mantodea
- Family: Nanomantidae
- Genus: Bolbena
- Species: B. minutissima

Binomial name
- Bolbena minutissima (Karny, 1908)

Species of praying mantis

Bolbena minutissima is a species of praying mantis in the family Nanomantidae.

== See also ==
- List of mantis genera and species
- Praying mantis
