= Phthersigena conspersa =

Scientific classification
- Kingdom: Animalia
- Phylum: Arthropoda
- Clade: Pancrustacea
- Class: Insecta
- Order: Mantodea
- Family: Nanomantidae
- Subfamily: Fulciniinae
- Genus: Phthersigena
- Species: P. conspersa

Binomial name
- Phthersigena conspersa Stål, 1871

Species of praying mantis

Phthersigena conspersa is a species of praying mantis in the family Nanomantidae. It is the type species of the genus Phthersigena and is native to Australia and New Guinea.

== See also ==
- List of mantis genera and species
