= Tropidomantis tenera =

Scientific classification
- Kingdom: Animalia
- Phylum: Arthropoda
- Clade: Pancrustacea
- Class: Insecta
- Order: Mantodea
- Family: Nanomantidae
- Genus: Tropidomantis
- Species: T. tenera

Binomial name
- Tropidomantis tenera Stål, 1860

Synonyms
- Tropidomantis perla Kirby, 1904

Species of praying mantis

Tropidomantis tenera is a species of praying mantis found in Thailand, Malaysia, Indonesia (Sumatra, Java, Flores, Sumba, Sulawesi, Borneo), and the Philippines. Females reach about 2.5 cm in length, and males are smaller.

Tropidomantis tenera has a yellow median line starting from the thorax and ending at the tip of the abdomen.

== See also ==
- List of mantis genera and species
