= Ilomantis thalassina =

Scientific classification
- Kingdom: Animalia
- Phylum: Arthropoda
- Class: Insecta
- Order: Mantodea
- Family: Nanomantidae
- Tribe: Nilomantini
- Genus: Ilomantis
- Species: I. thalassina

Binomial name
- Ilomantis thalassina Saussure, 1899

Species of praying mantis

Ilomantis thalassina is a species of praying mantis in the family Nanomantidae.
