= Phthersigena centralis =

Scientific classification
- Kingdom: Animalia
- Phylum: Arthropoda
- Clade: Pancrustacea
- Class: Insecta
- Order: Mantodea
- Family: Nanomantidae
- Genus: Phthersigena
- Species: P. centralis

Binomial name
- Phthersigena centralis Giglio-Tos, 1915

Species of praying mantis

Phthersigena centralis is a species of praying mantis that is endemic to Australia.

== See also ==
- List of mantis genera and species
