= Negromantis milloti =

Scientific classification
- Domain: Eukaryota
- Kingdom: Animalia
- Phylum: Arthropoda
- Class: Insecta
- Order: Mantodea
- Family: Nanomantidae
- Genus: Negromantis
- Species: N. milloti

Binomial name
- Negromantis milloti (Paulian, 1957)

Synonyms
- Mimomantis milloti Paulian, 1957

Genus of praying mantises

Negromantis milloti is a species of praying mantis found in Madagascar.

== See also ==
- List of mantis genera and species
