= Inimia =

Scientific classification
- Kingdom: Animalia
- Phylum: Arthropoda
- Clade: Pancrustacea
- Class: Insecta
- Order: Mantodea
- Family: Nanomantidae
- Subfamily: Fulciniinae
- Genus: Inimia
- Species: I. nat

Binomial name
- Inimia nat Connors, 2023

Genus and species of mantis

Inimia nat is a species of mantis in the family Nanomantidae and tribe Fulcinini, and it is the sole species in the genus Inimia. It is found in the vicinity of Crows Nest, a rural locality north of Toowoomba in south-eastern Queensland, Australia. Both the genus and species were described by Matthew Connors et al. in 2023.

== Discovery and etymology ==
This species was first discovered with the aid of the citizen science platform iNaturalist. Observations of the mantis were submitted by citizen scientist Glenda Walter, beginning in May 2022. Its novel appearance drew the attention of taxonomic researchers. Following standard practice in binomial nomenclature, Inimia nat may be abbreviated to I. nat. Its name is thus a wordplay paying homage to iNaturalist, or 'iNat' as it is sometimes abbreviated.
