= Fulcinini =

Scientific classification
- Kingdom: Animalia
- Phylum: Arthropoda
- Clade: Pancrustacea
- Class: Insecta
- Order: Mantodea
- Family: Nanomantidae
- Subfamily: Fulciniinae
- Tribe: Fulcinini; Ehrmann & Roy, 2002.

Genera
- See text

Tribe of mantises

Fulcinini is an Australian praying mantis tribe in the subfamily Fulciniinae.

== Genera ==
The Mantodea Species File lists the following genera:

- Calofulcinia Giglio-Tos, 1915
- Fulcinia Stal, 1877
- Fulciniella Giglio-Tos, 1915
- Hedigerella Werner, 1933
- Ima (mantis) Tindale, 1924
- Inimia Connors, 2023
- Machairima Beier, 1965
- Nannofulcinia Beier, 1965
- Papugalepsus Werner, 1928
- Pilomantis Giglio-Tos, 1915
- Tylomantis Westwood, 1889
