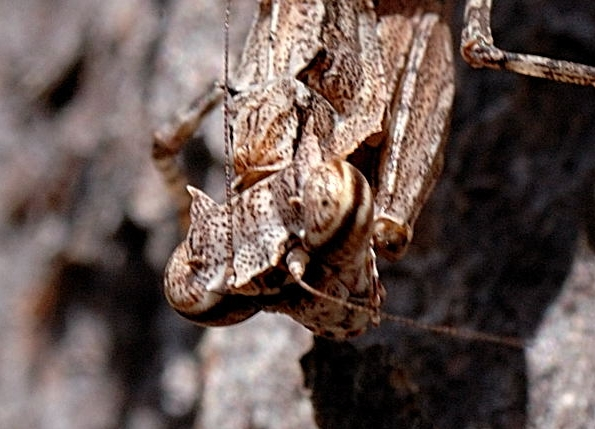
- Spiny bark mantis showing two spines just behind the eyes
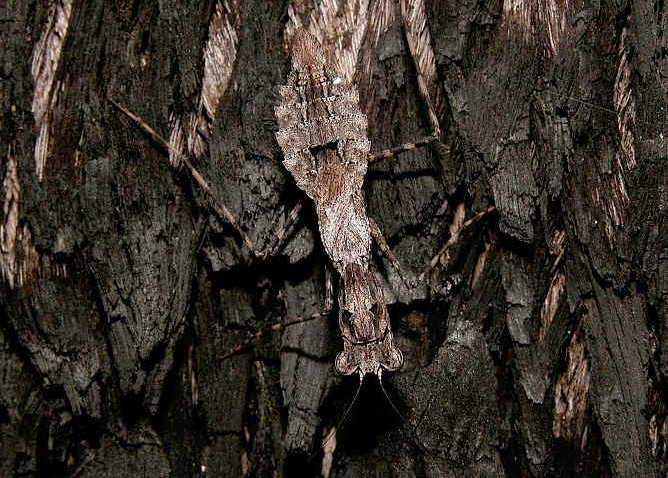
- Spiny bark mantis body

Scientific classification
- Kingdom: Animalia
- Phylum: Arthropoda
- Clade: Pancrustacea
- Class: Insecta
- Order: Mantodea
- Family: Nanomantidae
- Genus: Gyromantis
- Species: G. kraussi

Binomial name
- Gyromantis kraussi Saussure, 1872

= Gyromantis kraussi =

Spiny bark mantis

Species of praying mantis

Gyromantis kraussi, the spiny bark mantis, is a member of the mantis order. It is native to Australia.

Its name is inspired by the spines on its head and abdomen. The insect is also popularly known as a "bark runner," in reference to its response when startled.

Although many species of mantis are kept as pets, Gyromantis kraussi is less common due to its natural food sources, such as stink bugs, being difficult to provide.

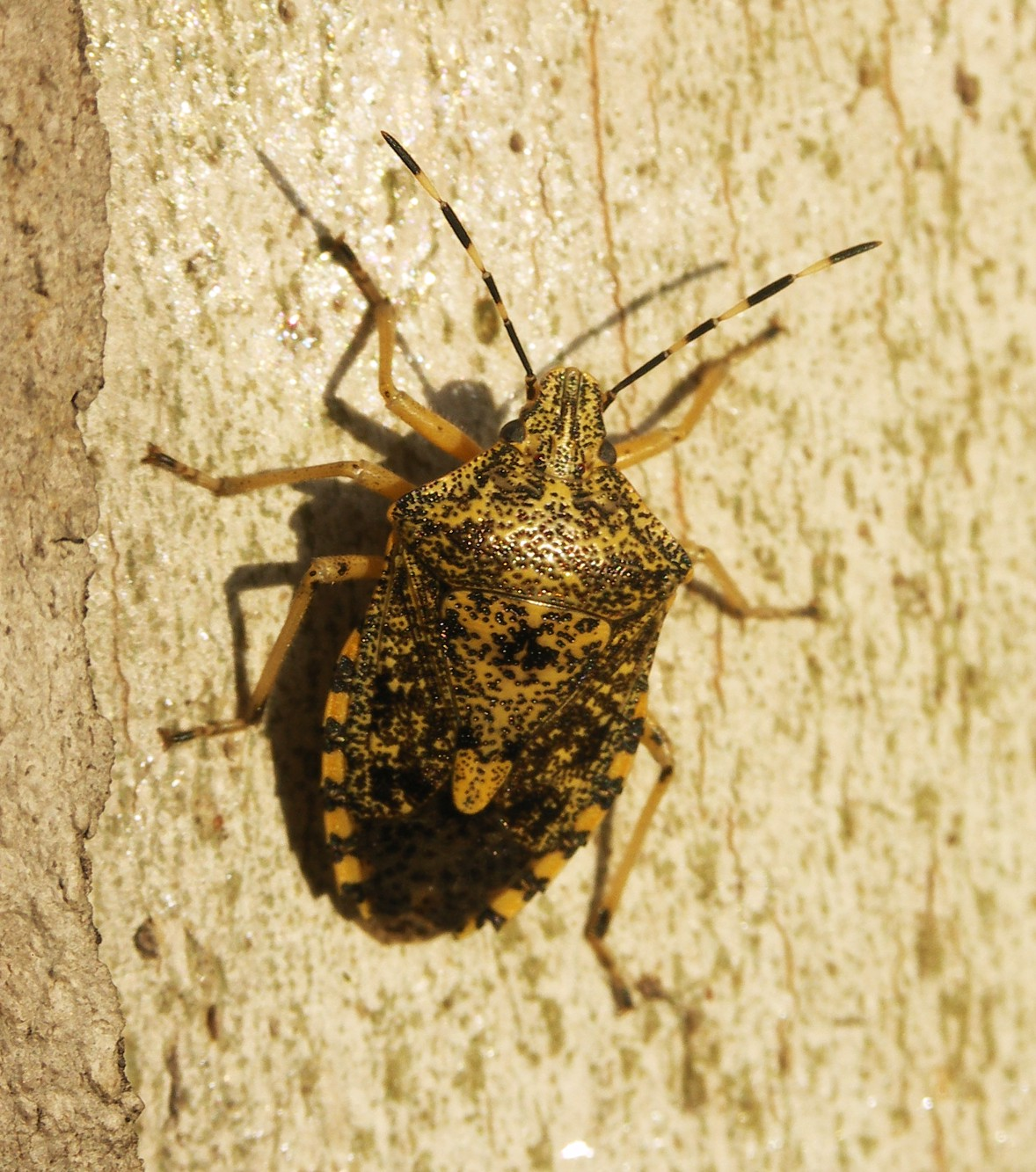
A stink bug, the natural prey of the spiny bark mantis.
