= Bolbula =

Scientific classification
- Kingdom: Animalia
- Phylum: Arthropoda
- Clade: Pancrustacea
- Class: Insecta
- Order: Mantodea
- Family: Nanomantidae
- Tribe: Hapalomantini
- Genus: Bolbula; Giglio-Tos, 1915

Species
- Bolbula debilis; Bolbula exigua; Bolbula widenmanni

Genus of praying mantises

Bolbula is a genus of praying mantises in the family Nanomantidae.

== See also ==
- List of mantis genera and species
