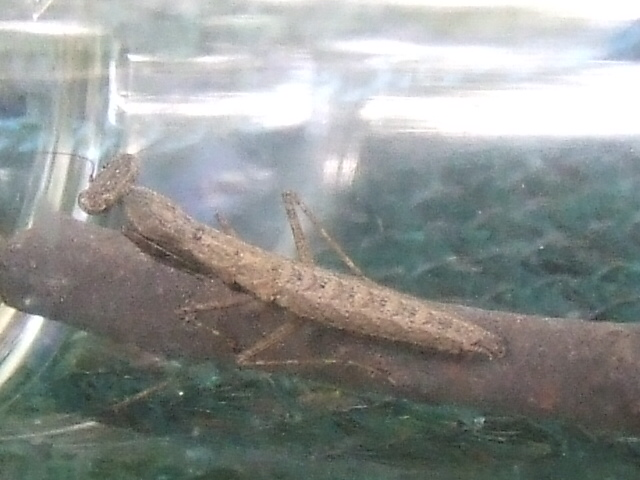

Scientific classification
- Kingdom: Animalia
- Phylum: Arthropoda
- Clade: Pancrustacea
- Class: Insecta
- Order: Mantodea
- Family: Nanomantidae
- Subtribe: Bolbina
- Genus: Bolbe; Stal, 1877

= Bolbe (mantis) =

Genus of praying mantises

Bolbe is a genus of praying mantises, sometimes called by the common name ground mantis, that are found in Australia.

== Species ==
The genus includes the following species:

- Bolbe lowi
- Bolbe maia
- Bolbe nigra
- Bolbe pallida
- Bolbe pygmaea

== See also ==
- List of Australian stick insects and mantids
- Category:Mantises of Oceania
- List of mantis genera and species
