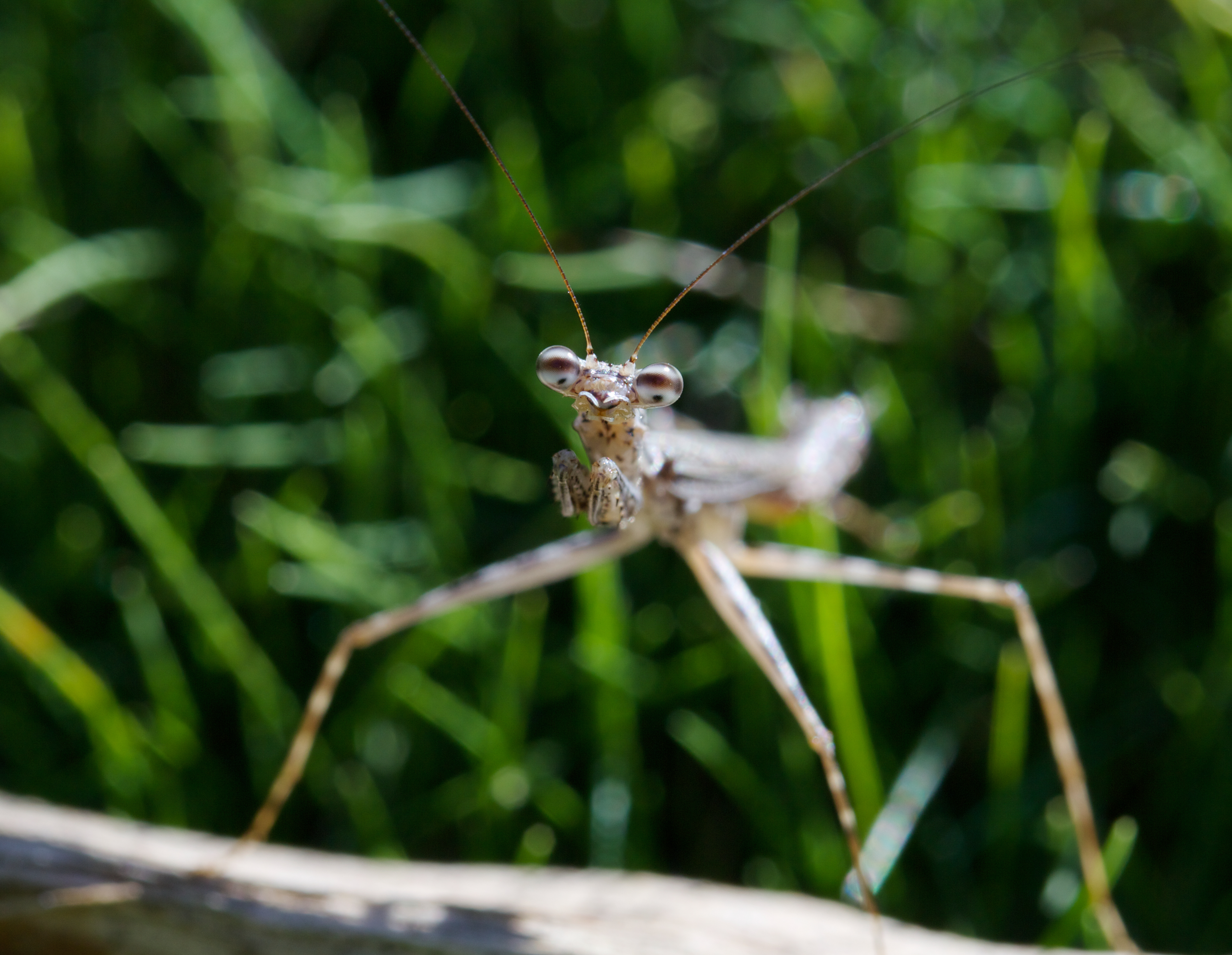

Scientific classification
- Kingdom: Animalia
- Phylum: Arthropoda
- Clade: Pancrustacea
- Class: Insecta
- Order: Mantodea
- Family: Nanomantidae
- Tribe: Stenomantini
- Genus: Ciulfina; Giglio-Tos, 1915

Species
- See text

= Ciulfina =

Genus of praying mantises

Ciulfina is a genus of small, tree-dwelling praying mantises belonging to the family Nanomantidae. They are native to Australia.

== Species ==
The following species are recognised in the genus Ciulfina:

- Ciulfina annecharlotteae
- Ciulfina baldersoni
- Ciulfina biseriata
- Ciulfina herbersteinae
- Ciulfina ianrichardi
- Ciulfina klassi
- Ciulfina liturgusa
- Ciulfina rentzi
- Ciulfina terrymariceae

== Description ==
Based upon the identification distinction of Ciulfina species through male genital morphology, an entomologist at Macquarie University suggests there may be more than fifteen Ciulfina species.
