= Fulcinia =

Scientific classification
- Kingdom: Animalia
- Phylum: Arthropoda
- Clade: Pancrustacea
- Class: Insecta
- Order: Mantodea
- Family: Nanomantidae
- Subfamily: Fulciniinae
- Tribe: Fulcinini
- Genus: Fulcinia; Stal, 1877

Synonyms
- Fulcinea Kirby, 1904; Oxyfulcinia Giglio-Tos, 1915; Papupopa Werner, 1928

Genus of praying mantises

Fulcinia is a genus of praying mantises found in Australia. It is the type genus of the subfamily Fulciniinae and tribe Fulciniini.

== Species ==
The Mantodea Species File lists the following species:

- Fulcinia alaris Saussure, 1871 - type species
- Fulcinia exilis Giglio-Tos, 1915
- Fulcinia lobata Werner, 1928
- Fulcinia punctipes Werner, 1928
- Fulcinia uxor Werner, 1928
- Fulcinia variipennis Westwood, 1889
