= Ptilotus senarius =

Conservation status
- Critically Endangered (NCA)

Scientific classification
- Kingdom: Plantae
- Clade: Embryophytes
- Clade: Tracheophytes
- Clade: Spermatophytes
- Clade: Angiosperms
- Clade: Eudicots
- Order: Caryophyllales
- Family: Amaranthaceae
- Genus: Ptilotus
- Species: P. senarius

Binomial name
- Ptilotus senarius A.R.Bean

Species of flowering plant

Ptilotus senarius is a species of flowering plant in the family Amaranthaceae and is endemic to northern Queensland, Australia. It is a slender, branched shrub with star-shaped hairs, linear leaves and groups of up to six flowers with boat-shaped bracts.

== Description ==
Ptilotus senarius is a slender, branched shrub that typically grows to a height of 30–60 cm (12–24 in) with a woody base. The stems are terete and covered with star-shaped hairs, densely so on new growing tips. The leaves are arranged alternately, linear, 7–31 mm (0.28–1.22 in) long and 0.6–1.5 mm (0.024–0.059 in) wide and lack a petiole. The flowers are arranged in group of up to six on the rachis with persistent, boat-shaped bracts 2.7–3.2 mm (0.11–0.13 in) long and densely covered with star-shaped or whorled hairs. The bracteoles are egg-shaped to boat-shaped, 3.8–4.6 mm (0.15–0.18 in) long but fall off as the flowers open. The perianth is 15–19 mm (0.59–0.75 in) long with five tepals that are grey when dried, the two outer tepals slightly longer than the three inner tepals. There are three fertile stamens 7–10 mm (0.28–0.39 in) long, the ovary is glabrous and the style is attached to the side of the ovary with an expanded stigma.

== Taxonomy ==
Ptilotus senarius was first formally described in 2014 by Anthony Bean in the journal Austrobaileya from specimens collected in 1967 near the Gilbert River by Samuel Justyn Dansie (1927–2012).

The species was presumed extinct after not being recorded since 1967, but the species was rediscovered in June 2025 by a citizen scientist using the iNaturalist platform.

== Distribution and habitat ==
This species has a highly restricted distribution in rough country between Georgetown and Croydon in northern Queensland, specifically within the Gilbert River region. Its habitat consists of "tea-tree forest" dominated by Melaleuca species and "grassy hills".

== Rediscovery ==
Before 2025, Ptilotus senarius was known from only two herbarium specimens collected in 1925 and 1967. In June 2025, horticulturist Aaron Bean photographed an unusual plant on a private property in the Gilbert River region and uploaded the images to iNaturalist. Researchers from the University of New South Wales and the Queensland Herbarium confirmed the identification through subsequent field visits.

== Conservation status ==
Ptilotus senarius is listed as 'critically endangered' under the Queensland Nature Conservation Act 1992.
