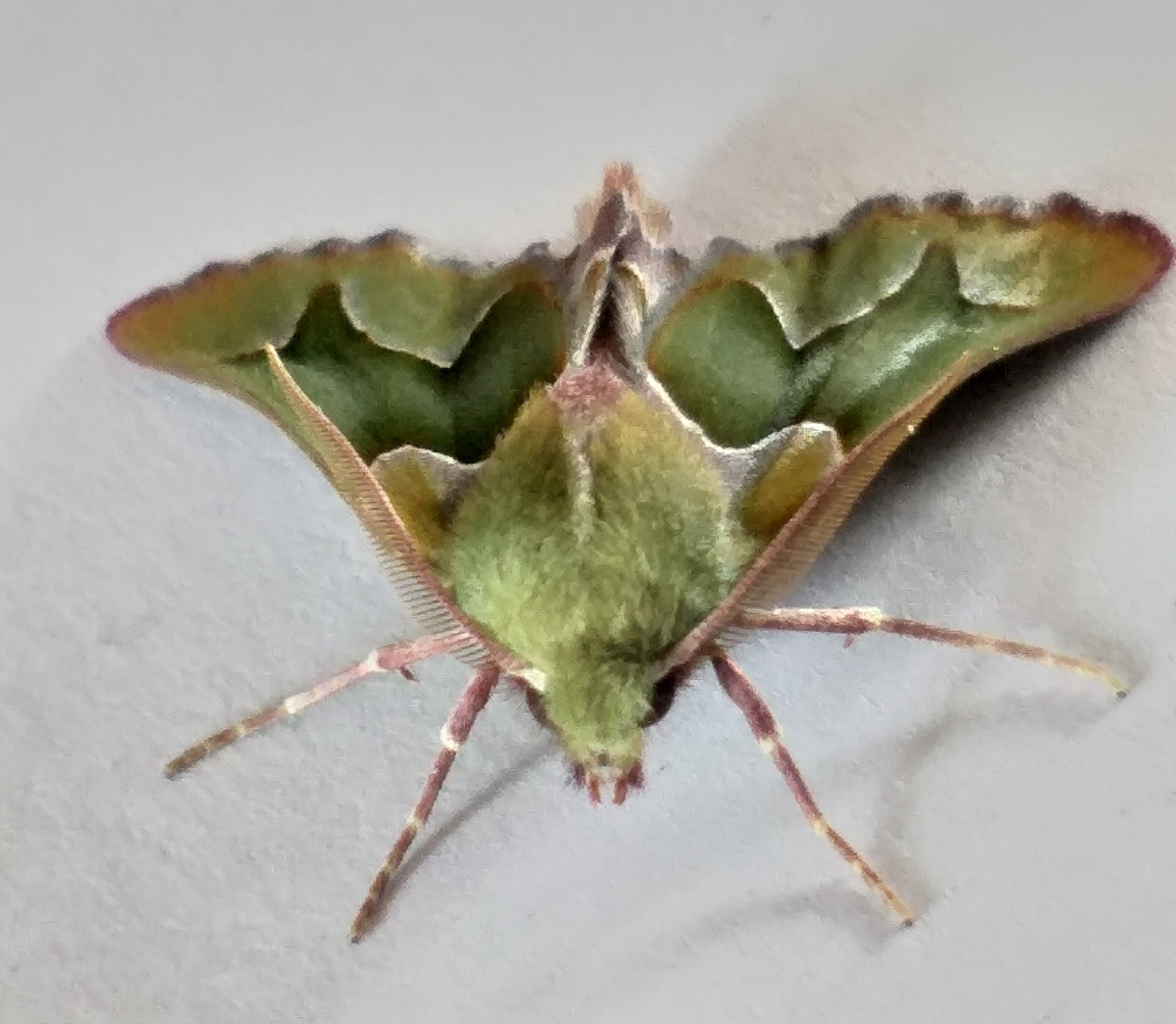

Scientific classification
- Kingdom: Animalia
- Phylum: Arthropoda
- Clade: Pancrustacea
- Class: Insecta
- Order: Lepidoptera
- Family: Geometridae
- Genus: Drepanogynis
- Species: D. insciata

Binomial name
- Drepanogynis insciata (Felder & Rogenhofer, 1875)

Synonyms
- Axiodes insciata (Felder & Rogenhofer, 1875)

= Drepanogynis insciata =

Species of moth endemic to South Africa

Drepanogynis insciata is a species of geometrid moth in the family Geometridae. It is endemic to the Western Cape in South Africa.

== History ==
Drepanogynis insciata was thought to be extinct for 147 years since 1879, where the species was known only from two specimens. Between 2020 and 2023, 13 specimens were recorded on iNaturalist.
