= INaturalist =

Website and app for sharing biodiversity observations

iNaturalist
- Website type: Citizen science
- Available in: 56 languages
- Area served: Worldwide
- Founders: Ken-ichi Ueda; Nate Agrin; Jessica Kline
- Website: inaturalist.org
- Commercial: No
- Registration: Optional
- Users: ▲5.0 million registered users (December 2025)
- Launched: 2008; 18 years ago
- Current status: Active

iNaturalist is an American 501(c)(3) nonprofit social network of naturalists, citizen scientists, and biologists built on the concept of mapping and sharing observations of biodiversity across the globe. iNaturalist may be accessed via its website or from its mobile applications. iNaturalist includes an automated species identification tool, and users further assist each other in identifying organisms from photographs and sound recordings. As of 5 August 2025, iNaturalist users had contributed nearly 300 million observations of plants, animals, fungi, and other organisms worldwide, and 400,000 users were active in the previous 30 days.

iNaturalist serves as an important resource of open data for biodiversity research, conservation, and education, describing itself as "an online social network of people sharing biodiversity information to help each other learn about nature." It is the primary application for crowd-sourced biodiversity data in places such as Mexico, southern Africa, and Australia, and the project has been called "a standard-bearer for natural history mobile applications." Most of iNaturalist's software is open source. It has contributed to over 4,000 research papers and is widely used by scientists, land managers, and conservationists worldwide. The platform has also been active in the discovery of new species and rediscovery of species previously assumed to be extinct.

== History ==
iNaturalist began in 2008 as a UC Berkeley School of Information Master's final project of Nate Agrin, Jessica Kline, and Ken-ichi Ueda. Agrin and Ueda continued work on the site with Sean McGregor, a web developer. In 2011, Ueda began collaboration with Scott Loarie, a research fellow at Stanford University and lecturer at UC Berkeley. Ueda and Loarie are the current co-directors of iNaturalist.org. The organization merged with the California Academy of Sciences on 24 April 2014. In 2017, iNaturalist became a joint initiative between the California Academy of Sciences and the National Geographic Society.

With these collaborations and growing popularity of the site since 2012, the number of participants and observations has roughly doubled each year. In 2014, iNaturalist reached 1 million observations. Later, as of October 2023, there were 181 million observations (163 million verifiable). On 11 July 2023 iNaturalist announced its status as a newly independent 501(c)(3) nonprofit organization.

=== Google.org AI Grant controversy ===
On 9 June 2025 Google.org announced that iNaturalist was awarded a philanthropic grant to use generative AI to address tough societal issues. This announcement, paired with the initial lack of information on the iNaturalist site, led to outcry from many iNaturalist users in the blog comments and forum, worrying about the consequences for the environment, volunteer engagement, reliability and raised questions about the decision making within iNaturalist, while some saw the backlash as a sign that people want to resist 'corrosive technologies'. PZ Myers, a biology professor who uses iNaturalist in his teaching, published an article on his website Pharyngula stating that "any decision that drives people away and replaces them with a hallucinating bot is a bad decision". Following the announcement, iNaturalist published a blog post clarifying its planned use of the grant, demoing mechanisms for scaling expert identification capacity and supporting community scientists.

== Platforms ==
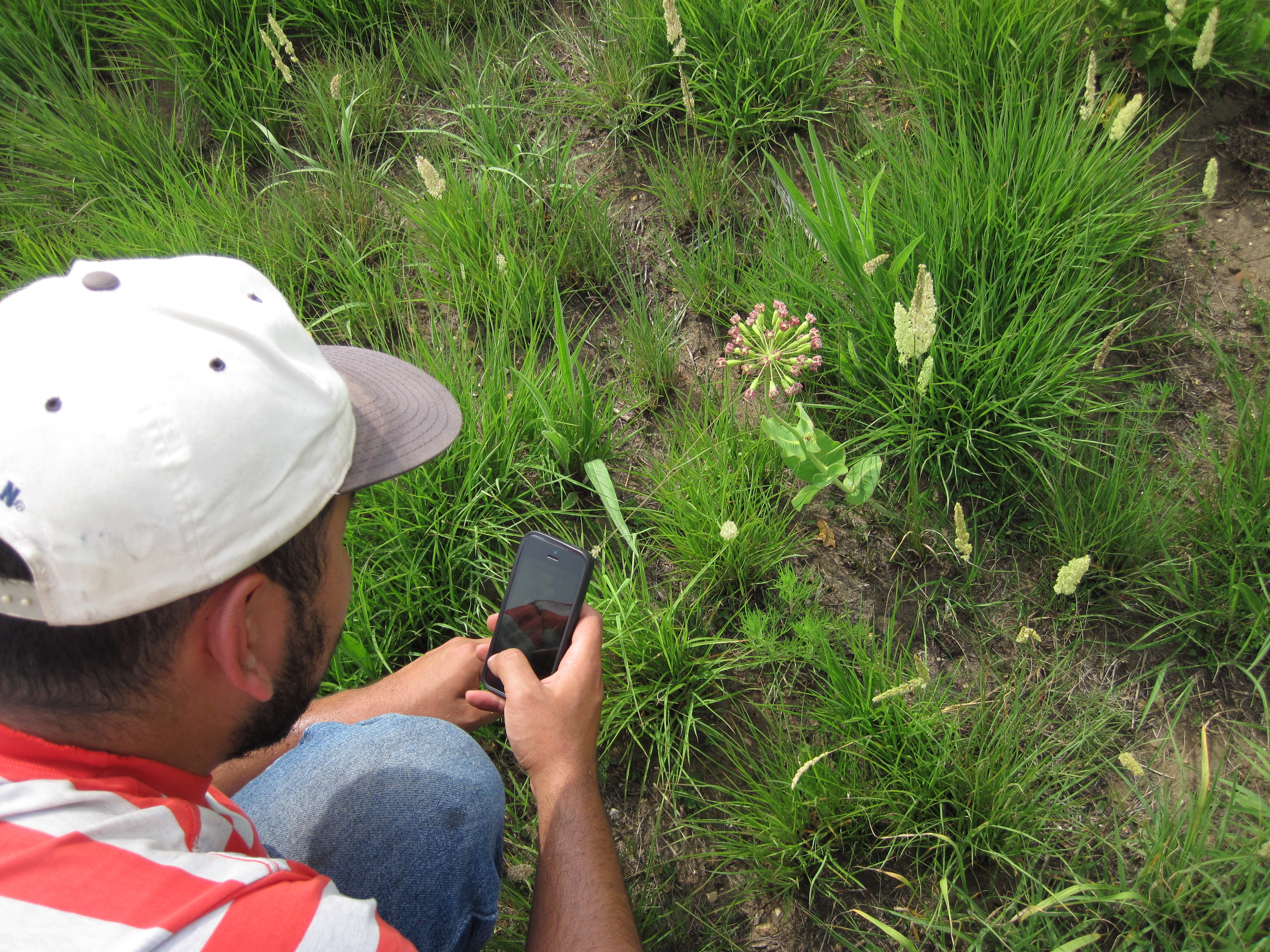
Taking a photo of Asclepias amplexicaulis (clasping milkweed) for iNaturalist

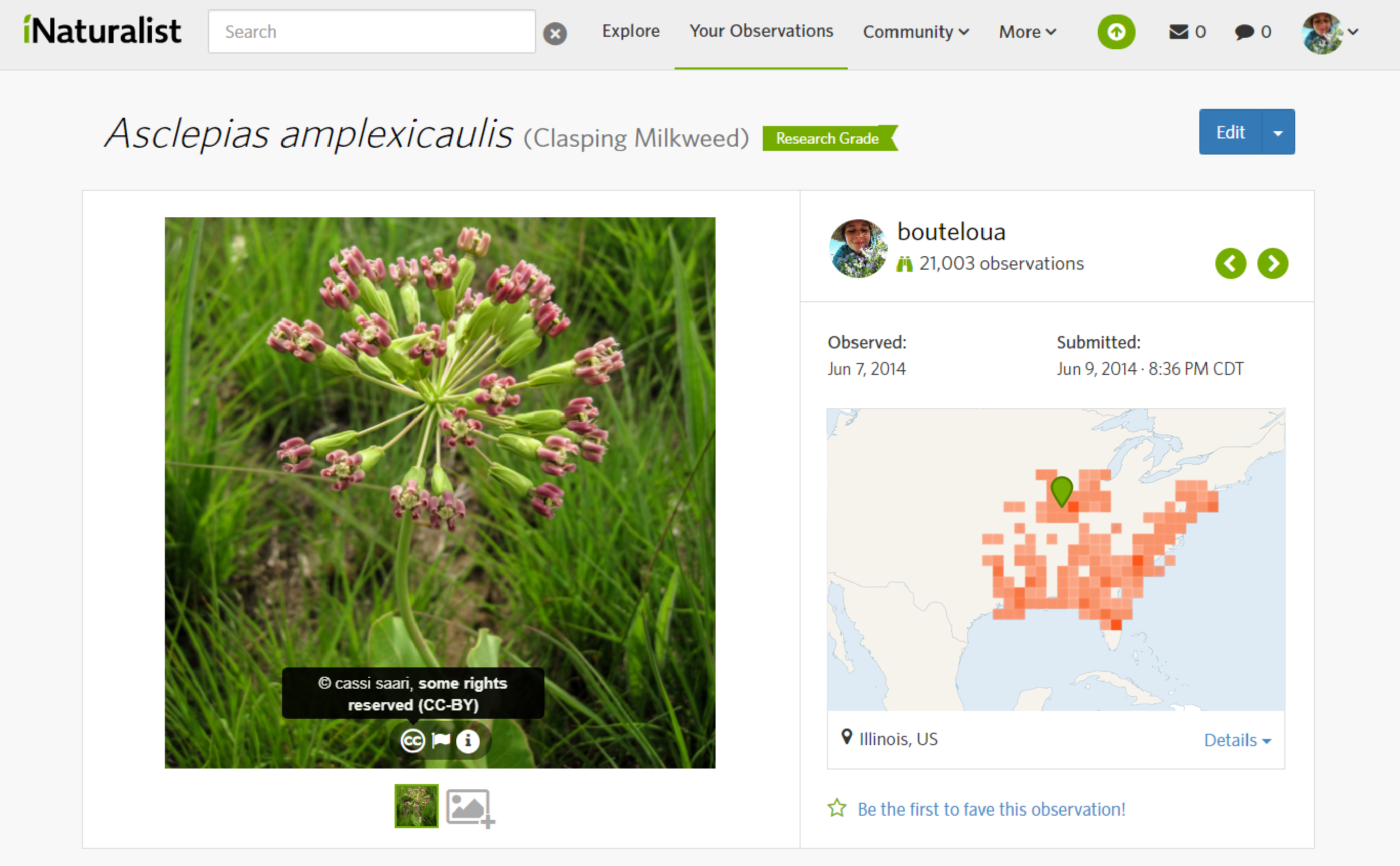
Screenshot of an observation at iNaturalist.org with CC-BY photo license type indicated

Users can interact with iNaturalist in the following ways:

- through the iNaturalist.org website,
- through two mobile apps: iNaturalist (iOS/Android) and Seek by iNaturalist (iOS/Android), or
- through partner organizations such as the Global Biodiversity Information Facility (GBIF) website.

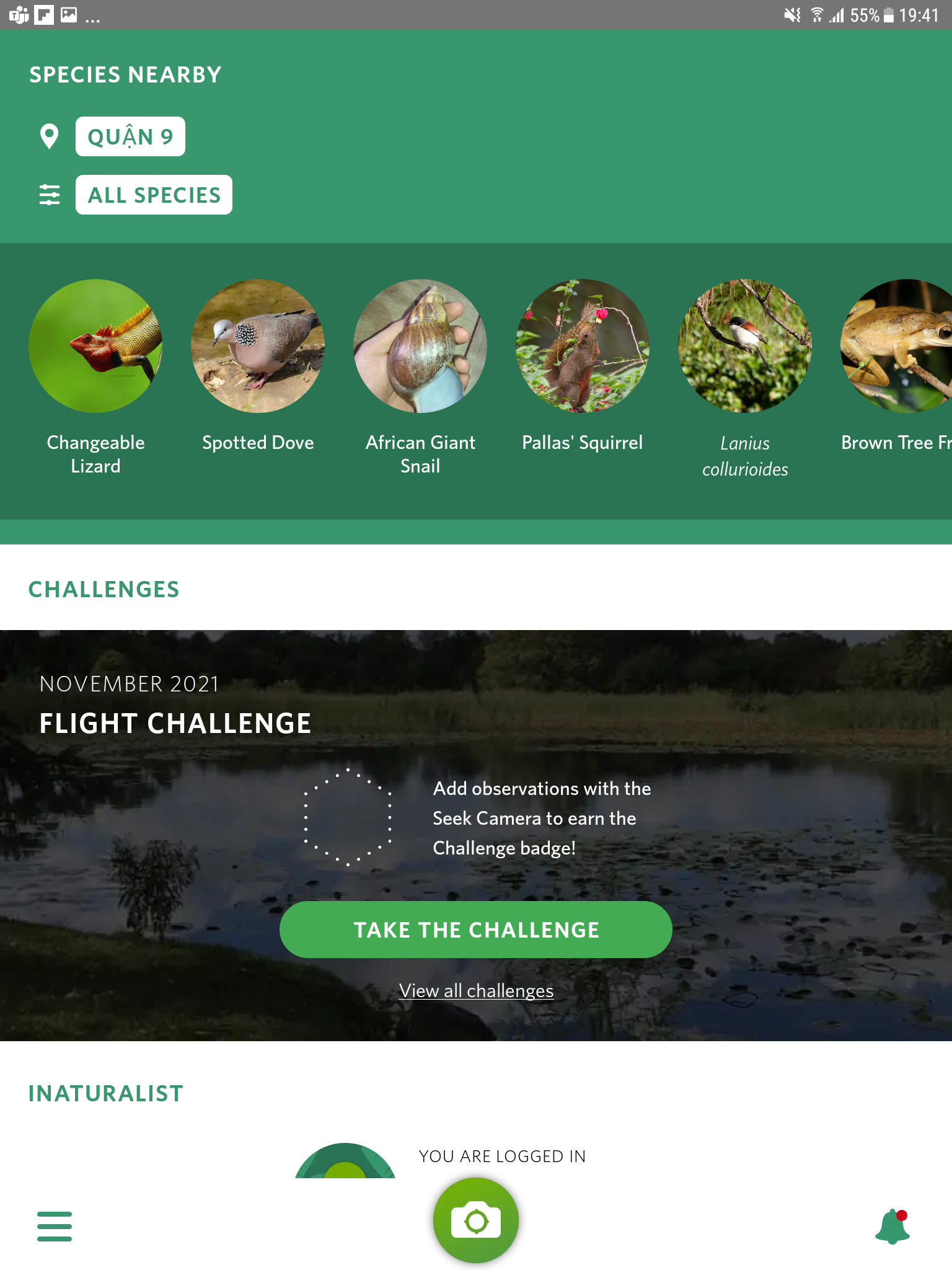
Seek's home page, showing local species and the Challenge for November 2021.

On the iNaturalist.org website, visitors can search the public dataset and interact with other people adding observations and identifications. The website provides tools for registered users to add, identify, and discuss observations, write journal posts, explore information about species, create project pages to recruit participation, and coordinate work on their topics of interest.

On the iNaturalist mobile app, users can create and share nature observations to the online dataset, explore observations both nearby and around the world, and learn about different species.

Seek by iNaturalist, a separate app marketed to families, requires no online account registration and all observations may remain private. Seek incorporates features of gamification, such as providing a list of nearby organisms to find and encouraging the collection of badges and participation in challenges. Seek was initially released in the spring of 2018.

== Observations ==
The iNaturalist platform is based on crowdsourcing of observations and identifications. An iNaturalist observation records a person's encounter with an individual organism at a particular time and place. An iNaturalist observation may also record evidence of an organism, such as animal tracks, nests, or scat. The scope of iNaturalist excludes natural but inert subjects such as geologic or hydrologic features. Users typically upload photos as evidence of their findings, though audio recordings are also accepted, and such evidence is not a strict requirement. Users may share observation locations publicly, "obscure" them to display a less precise location or make the locations completely private.

iNaturalist users can add identifications to each other's observations in order to confirm or improve the identification of the observation. Observations are classified as "Casual", "Needs ID" (needs identification), or "Research Grade" based on the quality of the data provided and the community identification process. Any quality of data can be downloaded from iNaturalist and "Research Grade" observations are often incorporated into other online databases such as the Global Biodiversity Information Facility and the Atlas of Living Australia.

=== Automated species identification ===
In addition to observations being identified by others in the community, iNaturalist includes an automated species identification tool, first released in 2017. Images can be identified via a computer vision model which has been trained on the large database of the observations on iNaturalist. Multiple species suggestions are typically provided with the suggestion that the software guesses to be most likely is at the top of the list. A broader taxon such as a genus or family is commonly provided if the model is unsure of the species. It is trained once or twice a year, and the threshold for species included in the training set has changed over time. It can be difficult for the model to guess correctly if the species in question is infrequently observed or hard to identify from images alone, or if the image submitted has poor lighting, is blurry, or contains multiple subjects.

In February 2023, iNaturalist released v2.1 of its computer vision model, which was trained on a new source model which performed significantly better than the previous models trained using a different source model. In April 2025 iNaturalist released an updated app for iOS, changing the original version to "iNaturalist Classic."

== Projects ==
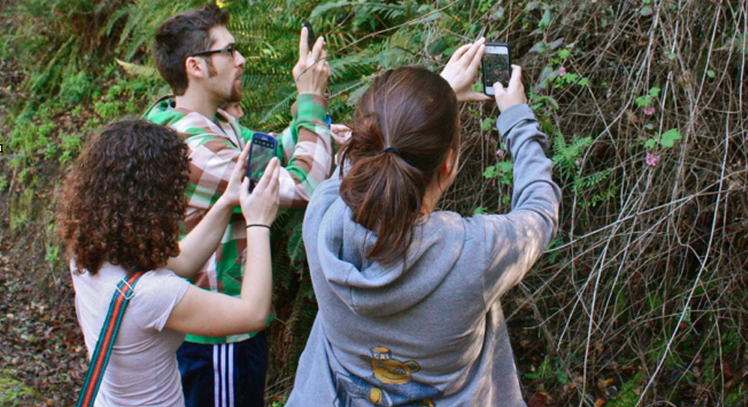
Using the iNaturalist app

Users have created and contributed to tens of thousands of different projects on iNaturalist. The platform is commonly used to record observations during bioblitzes, which are biological surveying events that attempt to record all the species that occur within a designated area, and a specific project type on iNaturalist. Other project types include collections of observations by location or taxon or documenting specific types of observations such as animal tracks and signs, the spread of invasive species, roadkill, fishing catches, or discovering new species. In 2011, iNaturalist was used as a platform to power the Global Amphibian and Global Reptile BioBlitzes, in which observations were used to help monitor the occurrence and distribution of the world's reptiles and amphibian species. The US National Park Service partnered with iNaturalist to record observations from the 2016 National Parks BioBlitz. That project exceeded 100,000 observations in August 2016. In 2017, the United Nations Environment Programme teamed up with iNaturalist to celebrate World Environment Day. In 2022, Reef Ecologic teamed up with iNaturalist to celebrate World Oceans Day.

=== City Nature Challenge ===
In 2016, Lila Higgins from the Natural History Museum of Los Angeles County and Alison Young from the California Academy of Sciences co-founded the City Nature Challenge (CNC). In the first City Nature Challenge, naturalists in Los Angeles and the San Francisco Bay Area documented over 20,000 observations with the iNaturalist platform. In 2017, the CNC expanded to 16 cities across the United States and collected over 125,000 observations of wildlife in 5 days. The CNC expanded to a global audience in 2018, with 68 cities participating from 19 countries, with some cities using community science platforms other than iNaturalist to participate. In 4 days, over 17,000 people cataloged over 440,000 nature observations in urban regions around the world. In 2019, the CNC once again expanded, with 35,000 participants in 159 cities collecting 964,000 observations of over 31,000 species. Although fewer observations were documented during the 2020 City Nature Challenge during the COVID-19 pandemic (when the CNC became collaborative as opposed to competitive), more cities and people participated, and more species were found than in previous years.

== Licensing ==
Users have the option to license their observations, photos, and audio recordings in several ways, including for the public domain, Creative Commons, or with all rights reserved. To encourage the sharing of information and to reduce costs, iNaturalist encourages users to license media with Creative Commons licenses. The default license is CC BY-NC, meaning others are free to copy, redistribute, remix, transform, and build upon the media as long as appropriate credit is given, changes are indicated, a link to the license is provided, and it is not used for commercial purposes.

Observations and media licensed with Creative Commons licenses are often shared elsewhere, including the Global Biodiversity Information Facility (excluding share-alike and no derivatives licenses), Atlas of Living Australia, and Wikipedia (excluding noncommercial and no derivatives licenses) through regular imports or user scripts such as iNaturalist2Commons and Wiki Loves iNaturalist.

The iNaturalist website and mobile apps are open-source software released under the MIT License.

== Research ==
As of January 2024, more than 4,000 research papers have been published that cite the iNaturalist research-grade observations hosted on the Global Biodiversity Information Facility (GBIF), often in the fields of ecology, conservation, and climate change. Many articles focus on climate-driven range shifts and expansions. For example:

- In 2015, data from iNaturalist was used to show that the Hopkin's rose nudibranch (Ceratodoris rosacea) is moving northward.
- Photos uploaded to iNaturalist in 2022 were used to confirm that the New Zealand hermit crab (Pagurus traversi) had been sighted in Tasmania and Victoria, Australia.
- In February 2024, photos posted on iNaturalist were used to report on the use of artificial shells (primarily plastic caps) by hermit crabs.
- In April 2024, iNaturalist data was used to show that the range of Himalayan giant honey bees (Apis laboriosa) had expanded southward to Thailand for the first time.

iNaturalist data has also been used to investigate phenology, the study of how life changes with the seasons.

In Nov 2025, a literature review published in BioScience found representation of research across 128 countries and 638 taxonomic families.

A 2023 field study comparing iNaturalist lichen records with expert identifications in Portugal and Italy found that fewer than half of the species logged by platform users matched the specialists' determinations, and roughly 70% of species-level identifications that appeared only on iNaturalist were wrong. The authors concluded that unchecked observations—especially of taxonomically difficult groups such as lichens—should be treated with caution when used for research, and they recommended raising the agreement threshold for "research-grade" status and providing clear imaging guidelines to volunteers. In a 2024 review of Red List practice for lichenized fungi, the authors cautioned that iNaturalist records are often difficult to verify from photographs alone and therefore should usually be excluded from lichen conservation assessments unless the species can be identified confidently from images or the observation has been expert-verified.

=== Discovery and rediscovery ===
Other published research focuses on the description of new species or rediscovery of species previously considered extinct.

- A species of snail, Myxostoma petiverianum, not documented since 1905, was rediscovered in Vietnam based on a photo taken in 2014 and uploaded to iNaturalist.
- In 2013, a citizen scientist in Colombia uploaded a photo of a poison dart frog, which researchers determined was a previously unrecognized species now known as Andinobates cassidyhornae.
- A casual weevil snapshot taken at Longwood Gardens in the Philadelphia suburbs and posted to iNaturalist in 2022 was the first documented sighting in decades of the greater chestnut weevil, thought to have gone extinct due to the 20th-century chestnut blight that killed most of its host species in North America.
- In 2023, a species of mantis first discovered with the aid of iNaturalist was named Inimia nat so that its abbreviated form, I. nat, would be a word play that pays homage to iNaturalist.
- The first-ever wild-specimen photograph of the New Britain goshawk was posted to iNaturalist in March 2024.
- The Colombian weasel, the rarest neotropical carnivore, was seen for the first time in the 21st century when an iNaturalist user uploaded snapshots of the weasel exploring a privy.
- Two teenagers in California used iNaturalist observations of unfamiliar scorpions as the first step in their eventual description of two new species (Paruroctonus soda and Paruroctonus conclusus).
- The frosted phoenix moth of New Zealand, feared extinct, was "rediscovered" when a Swedish birder who was in town to see kiwi put up a light to attract moths and snapped a casual photo of an insect that had parked itself under a lawn chair on his hotel balcony; his upload to iNaturalist was the first time the moth had been seen alive in 65 years.
- A commuter in London uploaded an observation of an insect on her bag to iNaturalist, which allowed it to be identified as a plane lace bug, Corythucha ciliata. This was the first recorded observation of the invasive species in the United Kingdom in about 18 years, and the observation sparked a national monitoring campaign to determine the spread of the insect in the country.
- A species of geometrid moth, Drepanogynis insciata, was thought to be extinct for 147 years (since 1879) in South Africa, where the species was known only from two specimens. Between 2020 and 2023, 13 specimens were recorded on iNaturalist.
- In December 2024, a new population of critically endangered Canterbury knobbled weevils (Hadramphus tuberculatus) was discovered after a farmer in Ashurton Lakes, New Zealand posted a picture of weevils he had discovered on a speargrass plant. The weevils were previously known only to live in one other location about 80 km (50 mi) away, and the population in that location was considered to be critically low.
- A bushwalking mom exploring in Victoria, Australia, took the first-ever wild-specimen photographs of the antlion species Myrmeleon houstoni, previously they were only know from museum entomology collections; her daughter photographed another specimen of the same species a few weeks later.
- A presumed extinct Australian plant species, Ptilotus senarius, was resurrected to extant and rare status based on an observation uploaded to iNaturalist in June 2025.
- In August 2025, Taczanowskia waska (a spider with novel mimicry of a Cordyceps infection) was identified as a new species of spider in Ecuador.

=== Morphology ===
Other research has focused on the morphology or coloration of species observations. For example, a study in 2019 assessed the relationship between wing coloration and temperature in the dragonfly species Pachydiplax longipennis.

=== DNA barcoding ===
Mycologists running community-managed high-throughput fungal DNA barcoding labs published 45,000 DNA sequences between 2016 and 2023, many via iNaturalist, which allows for association of specimen photographs and geolocations with DNA sequences. Using iNat "engages experts within the community. This facilitates open peer review and public feedback among professional and amateur mycologists." As of December 2025, there were more than 7,600 fungi species on iNat with associated DNA barcodes. In December 2025, iNaturalist launched a "provisional name" field on a pilot basis, allowing expert contributors to tag DNA-barcoded fungi observations of what are likely new species that have not yet been formally described and named with a staff-created standardized temporary species name such as Calonarius sp. 'CA03'. (Identifications of formally undescribed plant galls, sans DNA, are currently associated in a similar way, with superficially fuzzy galls appearing on chestnut oak leaves, for instance, being tagged by a unified, externally defined name like q-montana-fuzzy-sphere-cluster.)

== Graphs ==
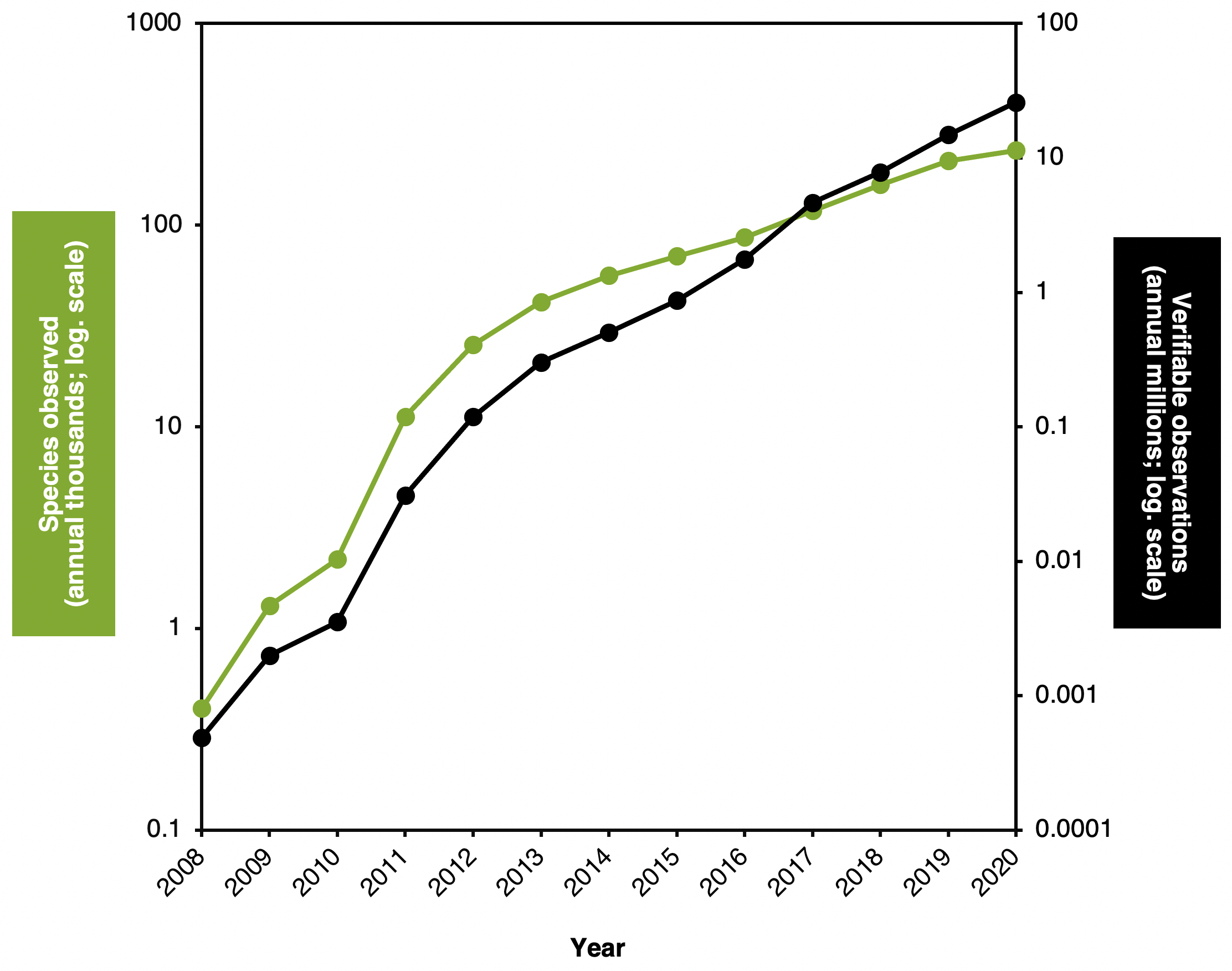
Semi-log plot of annual changes in number of species observed (in thousands; green) and number of verifiable (Note: On iNaturalist, an observation is "verifiable" if it has no penalties in its Data Quality Assessment. Observations lacking a date, location, or media are automatically penalised, and users may grant penalties if they deem that the date or location is inaccurate, or that there is no recent evidence of a single, wild, accurately depicted organism. Non-verifiable observations are hidden from view by default, unless expressly enabled.) observations (in millions; black).

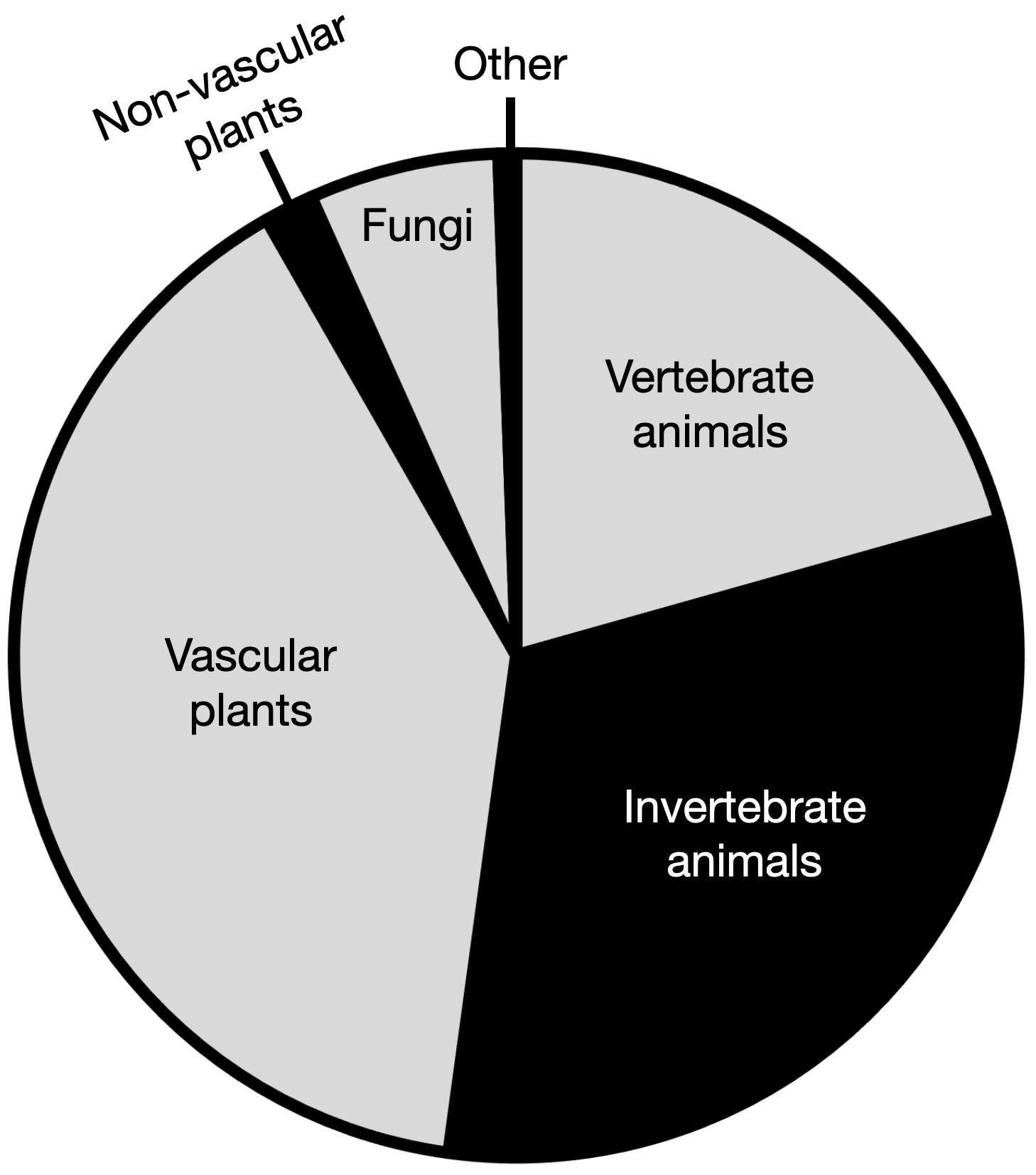
Relative proportions of verifiable observations according to taxonomic group as of January 2022
