= Myrmecomantis =

Ant mantis

Scientific classification
- Kingdom: Animalia
- Phylum: Arthropoda
- Class: Insecta
- Order: Mantodea
- Family: Nanomantidae
- Genus: Myrmecomantis; Giglio-Tos, 1913
- Species: M. atra

Binomial name
- Myrmecomantis atra Giglio-Tos, 1913

Species of praying mantis

Myrmecomantis is a genus of praying mantises in the family Nanomantidae. It is monotypic, being represented by the single species, Myrmecomantis atra, commonly known as the ant mantis. It is a species that relies upon ant mimicry for protection even as an adult.

== See also ==
- List of mantis genera and species
