= Gyromantis =

Scientific classification
- Kingdom: Animalia
- Phylum: Arthropoda
- Clade: Pancrustacea
- Class: Insecta
- Order: Mantodea
- Family: Nanomantidae
- Subtribe: Paraoxypilina
- Genus: Gyromantis; Giglio-Tos, 1913

Genus of praying mantises

Gyromantis is genus of praying mantises represented by two species of bark mantis:

- Gyromantis kraussi (spiny bark mantis)
- Gyromantis occidentalis (eastern bark mantis)

== See also ==
- List of mantis genera and species
