= Phthersigena melania =

Scientific classification
- Domain: Eukaryota
- Kingdom: Animalia
- Phylum: Arthropoda
- Class: Insecta
- Order: Mantodea
- Family: Nanomantidae
- Genus: Phthersigena
- Species: P. melania

Binomial name
- Phthersigena melania Tindale, 1923

Synonyms
- Glabromantis melania

Species of praying mantis

Phthersigena melania is a species of praying mantis in the family Nanomantidae. It is endemic to native to Australia's Northern Territory.

== See also ==
- List of mantis genera and species
