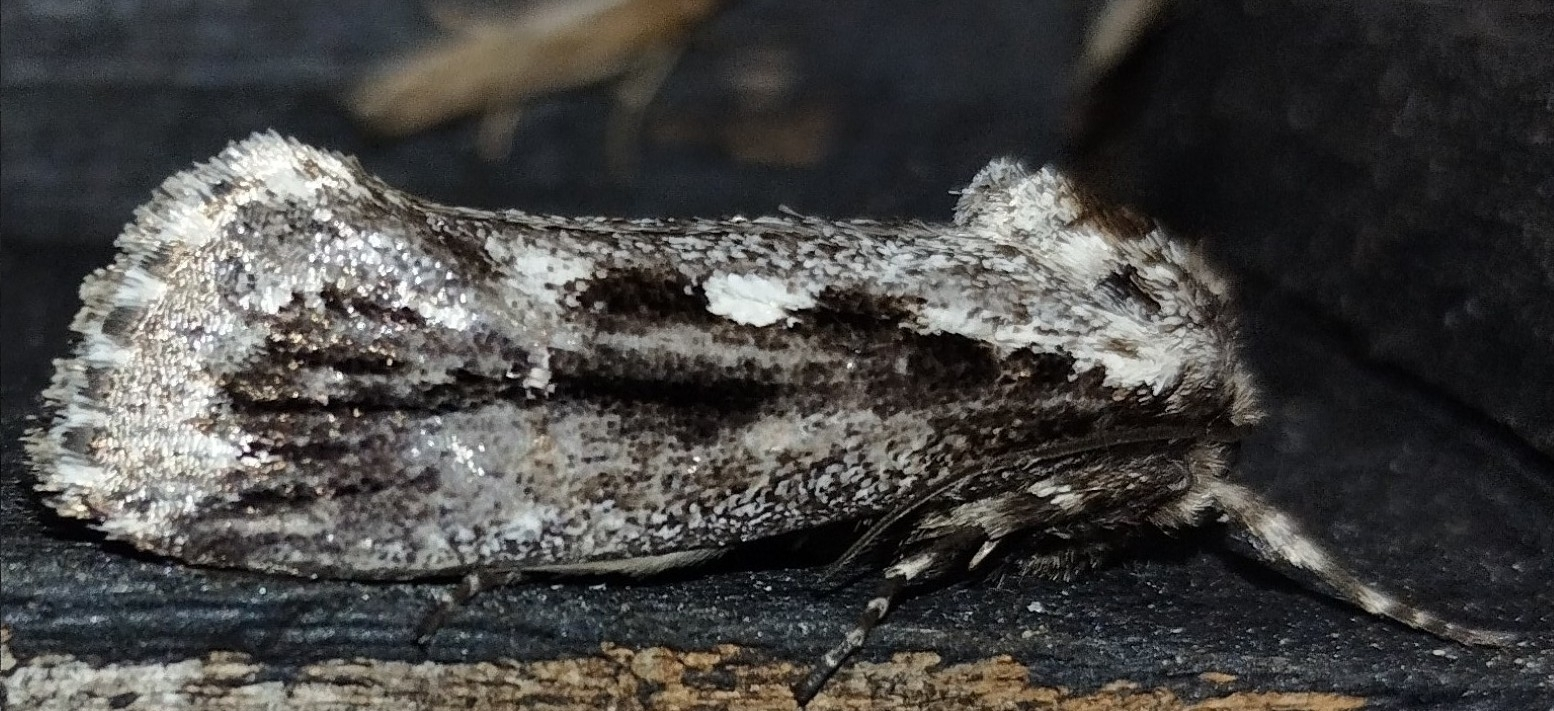
- Titanomis sisyrota photographed by Pav Johnsson on the balcony of the South Sea Hotel, Oban, March 2024

Conservation status
- Data Deficit (NZ TCS)

Scientific classification
- Kingdom: Animalia
- Phylum: Arthropoda
- Clade: Pancrustacea
- Class: Insecta
- Order: Lepidoptera
- Clade: Apoditrysia
- Family: incertae sedis
- Genus: Titanomis; Meyrick, 1888
- Species: T. sisyrota

Binomial name
- Titanomis sisyrota Meyrick, 1888

Synonyms
- Titonomis Dalla Torre & Strand, 1929

= Titanomis =

Genus of insects

Titanomis is a genus of moths containing a single species, Titanomis sisyrota, also known as the frosted phoenix. Taxonomists are currently unable to place this moth within an existing superfamily. The species is currently regarded as endemic to New Zealand, and classified as "Data Deficient" by the Department of Conservation. Described as "New Zealand's most enigmatic moth", only ten specimens have been collected, none since 1959. After 65 years without a sighting, a living individual was observed in March 2024 by a Swedish tourist.

== Taxonomy ==
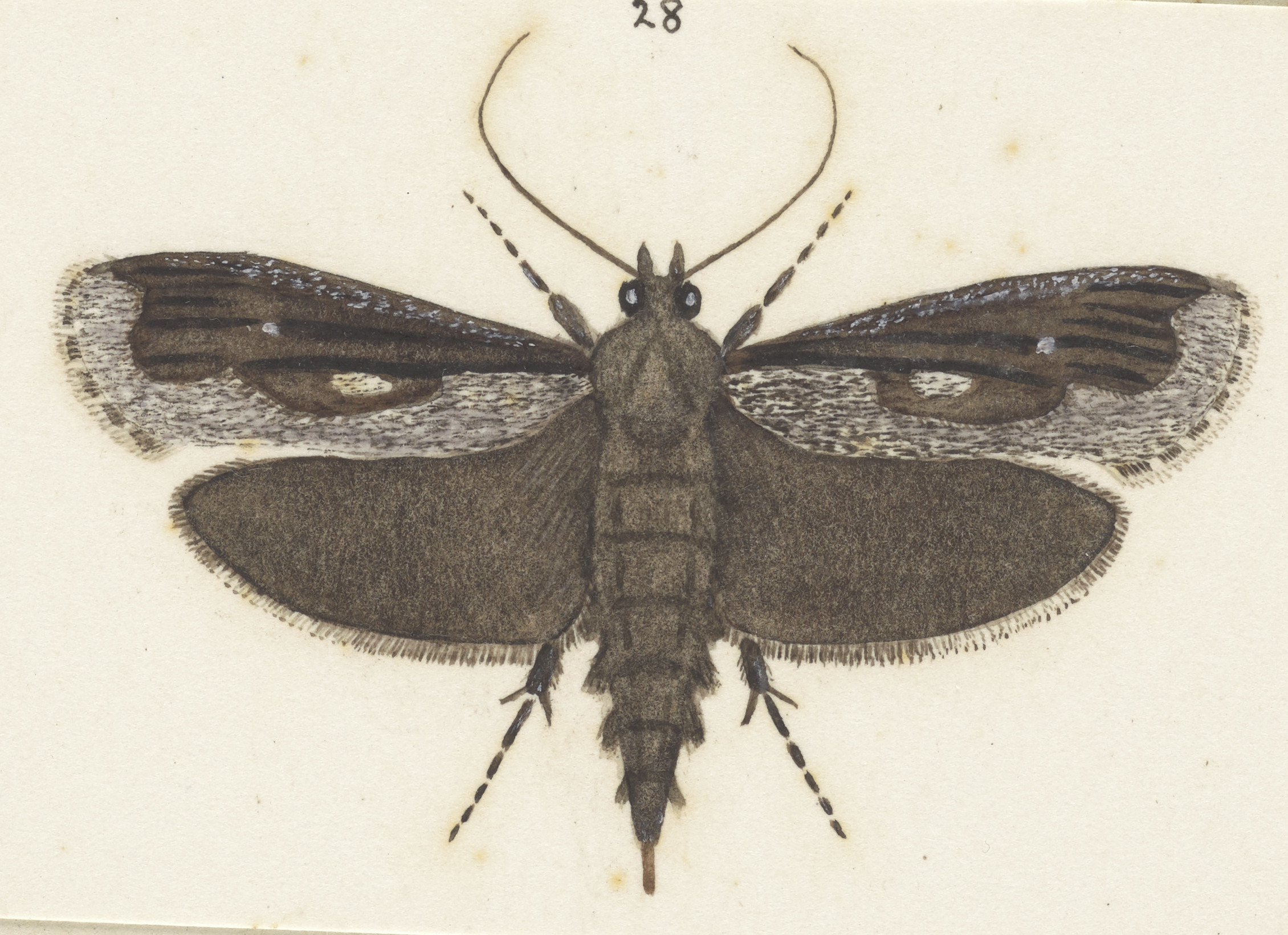
Illustrated by George Vernon Hudson in his 1928 Butterflies and Moths of New Zealand

Titanomis is considered an enigmatic, unplaced genus and may require its own family. The genus and species were first described by Edward Meyrick in 1888 using a specimen collected by George Hudson collected in Nelson.

The location of that specimen's collection needed to be clarified, resulting in an error made by Meyrick. In his 1928 book The Moths and Butterflies of New Zealand, Hudson discussed and illustrated this species and noted catching the holotype in 1882 in Nelson. However, the label written by Meyrick stated that Hudson collected the holotype on 10 May 1885 in Wellington. John S. Dugdale, in his Annotated Catalogue of New Zealand Lepidoptera, accepted that the species' type locality was Nelson. The error arose from Meyrick needing clarification on the details of the capture of the holotype and its shipment to the United Kingdom. The holotype specimen is held at the Natural History Museum, London.

== Etymology ==
The genus name is derived from Titan, meaning giant, and anomis, meaning anomalous. It refers to the size and unusual morphology of the group in which the species was originally placed. The epithet is derived from sisyrota, meaning wearing a hairy garment, and refers to the hairs on the inner margin of the hindwings.

In 2001 New Zealand lepidopterist Robert Hoare described T. sisyrota as "New Zealand's most enigmatic moth", and proposed the common name "Frosted Phoenix", alluding to the way the elusive moth "burns into ashes and then rises again", and its ash-coloured forewings.

== Description ==
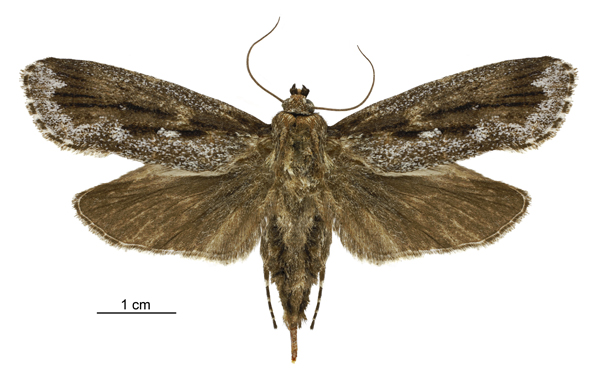
A female specimen of Titanomis sisyrota

Meyrick described the species as follows:

Female. — 65 mm. Head, palpi, and thorax whitish suffusedly irrorated with dark fuscous (partly defaced). Antennae fuscous. Abdomen rather dark fuscous. Anterior legs dark fuscous, apex of joints obscurely whitish (middle and posterior pair broken). Forewings elongate-oblong, costa gently arched, apex rounded, hindmargin rather oblique, slightly rounded; rather dark fuscous, irrorated with white except on an irregular posteriorly dilated median longitudinal space ceasing before hindmargin, and somewhat sprinkled with black on veins; a black streak along submedian fold from near base to beyond middle, interrupted before its apex by a subtriangular white spot : a black longitudinal streak in disc from before middle to about 4/5, interrupted by a small round white spot at 3/5 : cilia rather dark fuscous, barred with white (imperfect). Hindwings and cilia fuscous.

The appearance of this moth may give clues as to its preferred habitat. It has been hypothesised that the whitish border of the wings assists the moth's camouflage against mottled bark, indicating a possible preference for forest habitat.

== Distribution ==
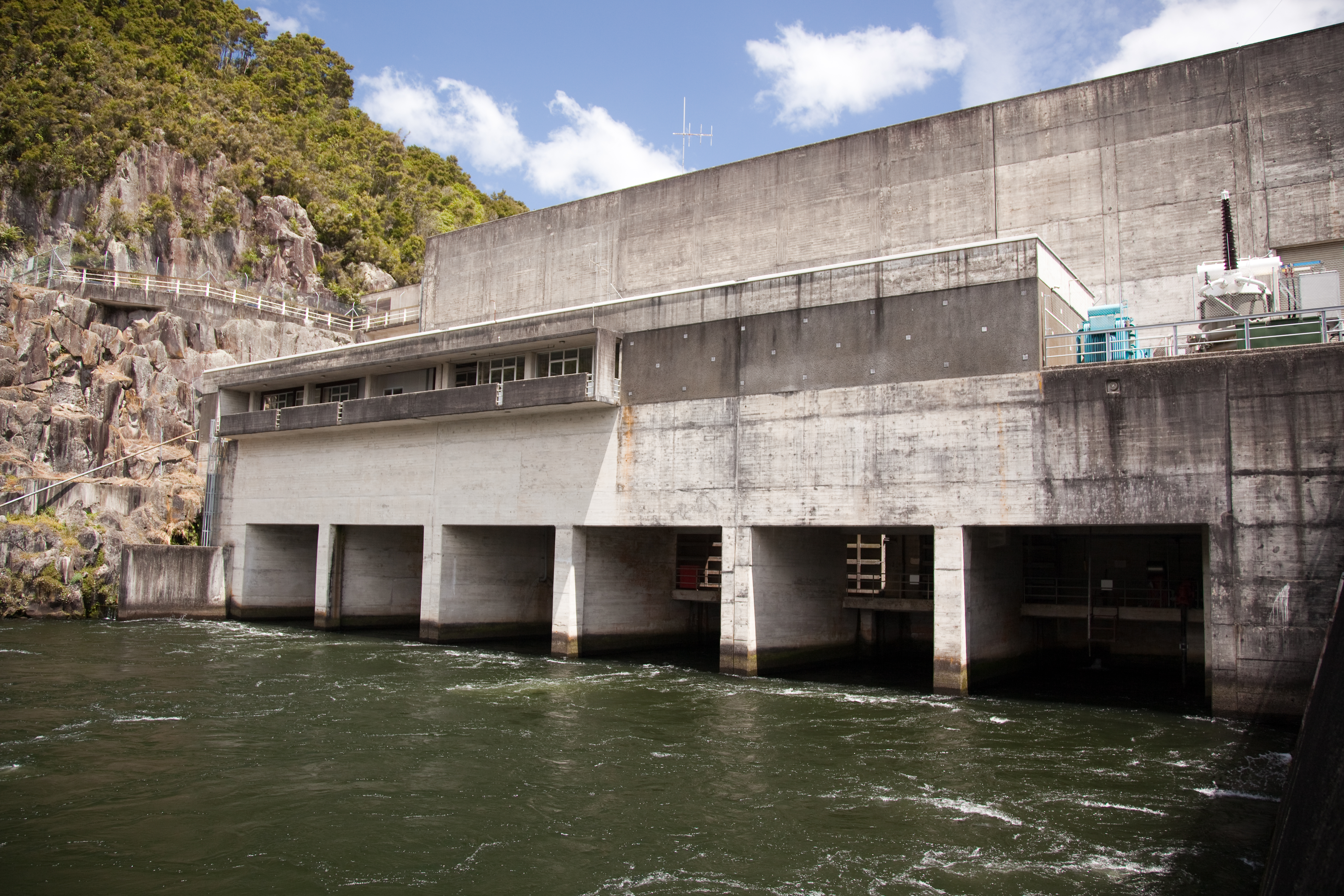
Waipapa Dam

The species is currently accepted as endemic to New Zealand. However, this is an extremely rare species with only ten reliable records as of 2001. Based on this irregular pattern of occurrences, the species may be a sporadic immigrant.

It has been found in the Waikato, Taupō, Wellington, Nelson, Marlborough, Westland and Southland areas. The earliest capture recorded was at Greymouth in December 1874, and other specimens were taken in Nelson around the same time. Other than the type specimen mentioned above, specimens were also collected in Blenheim in 1883, Ōtaki in 1886, Nelson in 1898, Haldane in Southland in 1900, and by a Mrs H. Hamilton in Rangataua near Ohakune in 1921. The most recent collection of this species occurred at Waipapa Dam in the Waikato in 1959, where it was attracted to the floodlights; Charles Hudson Guard sent the specimen to John Dugdale at the Forest Research Institute, temporarily stored in a tobacco tin which was subsequently mislaid, so the most recent specimen in any collection – Te Papa in this case – is from 1921.

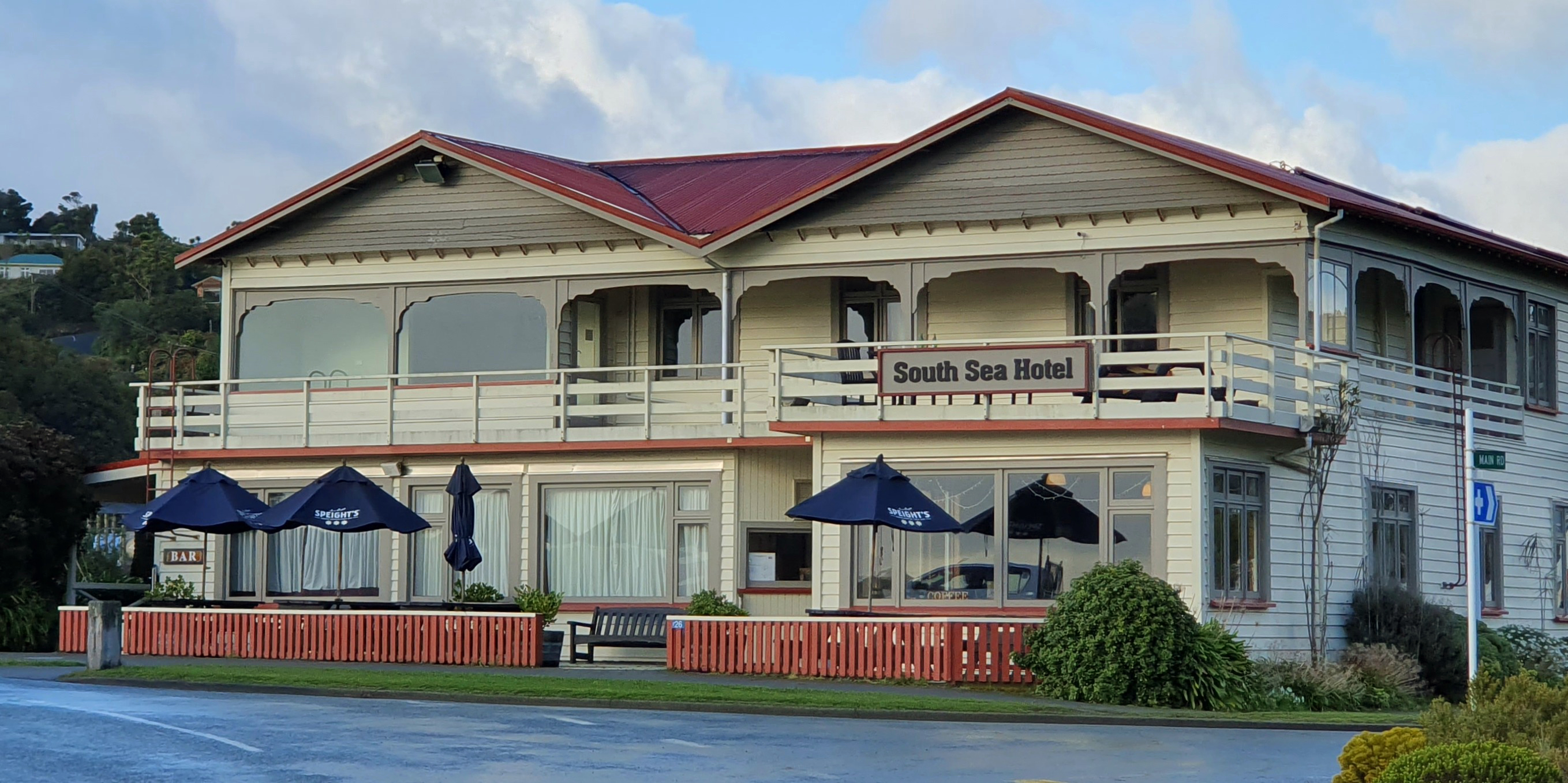
South Sea Hotel, Oban, Rakiura

On 2 March 2024, a Swedish birdwatching group led by biologist and school teacher Pav Johnsson visited Stewart Island / Rakiura. The group was staying at the South Sea Hotel in Oban, and Johnsson set up a UV light on his second-floor balcony before they set out to search for kiwi. Upon their return, Johnsson noticed a large, robust moth beneath a chair and took two photographs with his phone. On returning to Sweden, he uploaded a photo to iNaturalist, where it was identified by Robert Hoare as Titanomis sisyrota, making Johnsson the only living person as at March 2024 to have observed the species and the first one to photograph it. Johnsson referred to himself deprecatingly as "some lucky idiot in the right spot at the right time."

== Biology and behaviour ==
Very little is known about the biology of T. sisyrota. Adults are on the wing from December until March. They are attracted to light, with at least two specimens collected in living rooms and another at the floodlights of Waipapa Dam. Based on the living room collections, it has been hypothesised that the adult moth may be more attracted to weaker or less ultraviolet light sources; Pav Johnsson's observation was made with a commercial moth light that used UV and several other wavelengths.

== Host species and habitat ==
The host niche is unknown, but based on the morphology of the species, it has been hypothesised to be woody branches or stems of living plants, rotten wood, or even bracket fungi, into which females likely insert their eggs. There are several hypotheses about its preferred habitat. Many of the specimens have been taken near the beech forest. The larvae of this species may be associated with rotten podocarp wood, as all the collection localities are close to valley floor kahikatea and mataī forest. The 1959 specimen also occurred near a kanuka forest. T. sisyrota may also be associated with wetland habits, as females of this species come to light more frequently than the males and are therefore more likely to feed on scattered food sources, a feature of species that prefer wetlands.

== Conservation status ==
This species is classed as "Data Deficient" under the New Zealand Threat Classification System. Before the observation by Johnsson, there had been no record of capture of this species for over 65 years, so some regarded the frosted phoenix as possibly extinct. This lack of observations likely reflected the small number of entomologists searching for this species, although notable lepidopterists such as John Dugdale, Neville Hudson, and Brian Patrick had looked for it for many years without success.
