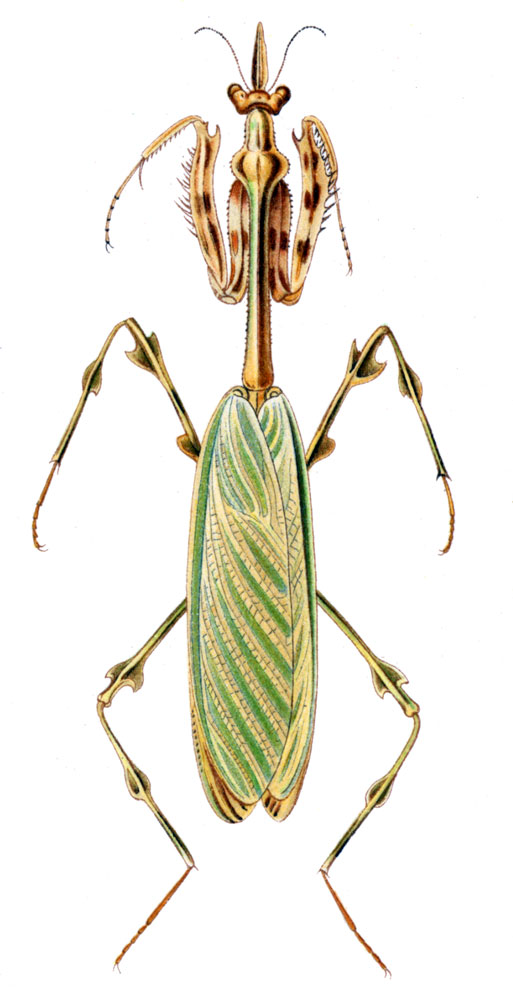
- Zoolea lobipes

Scientific classification
- Kingdom: Animalia
- Phylum: Arthropoda
- Clade: Pancrustacea
- Class: Insecta
- Order: Mantodea
- Family: Mantidae
- Subfamily: Vatinae
- Tribe: Vatini
- Genus: Zoolea; Serville, 1839

= Zoolea =

Genus of praying mantises

Zoolea is a South American genus of praying mantises.

== Species ==
The Mantodea Species File lists:

- Zoolea descampsi Roy & Ehrmann, 2009
- Zoolea lobipes Olivier, 1792 - type species
- Zoolea major Giglio-Tos, 1914
- Zoolea minor Giglio-Tos, 1914
- Zoolea orba Burmeister, 1838

== Description ==
A characteristic of this genus is anterior femora with superior pre-apical lobes. This genus is one which contains species known as Unicorn Mantis.
