= Hapalomantis =

Scientific classification
- Kingdom: Animalia
- Phylum: Arthropoda
- Clade: Pancrustacea
- Class: Insecta
- Order: Mantodea
- Family: Nanomantidae
- Subfamily: Hapalomantinae
- Tribe: Hapalomantini
- Genus: Hapalomantis; Saussure, 1871

Genus of mantises

Hapalomantis (from Ancient Greek απαλος (hapalos), meaning "delicate", and "mantis") is a genus of mantises belonging to the family Nanomantidae. It is distributed in Africa.

Hapalomantis measure 12–18 mm (0.47–0.71 in) in length.

== Species ==
There are seven recognized species:

- Hapalomantis abyssinica Beier, 1931
- Hapalomantis congica Giglio-Tos, 1915
- Hapalomantis katangica Beier, 1935
- Hapalomantis lacualis Giglio-Tos, 1915
- Hapalomantis minima (Werner, 1906)
- Hapalomantis orba (Stal, 1856)
- Hapalomantis rhombochir Werner, 1908
