= Ilomantis =

Scientific classification
- Kingdom: Animalia
- Phylum: Arthropoda
- Clade: Pancrustacea
- Class: Insecta
- Order: Mantodea
- Family: Nanomantidae
- Tribe: Nilomantini
- Genus: Ilomantis; Saussure 1899

Genus of praying mantises

Ilomantis is a genus of praying mantises.

== Species ==
- Ilomantis ginsburgae
- Ilomantis thalassina, found in Madagascar

== See also ==
- List of mantis genera and species
