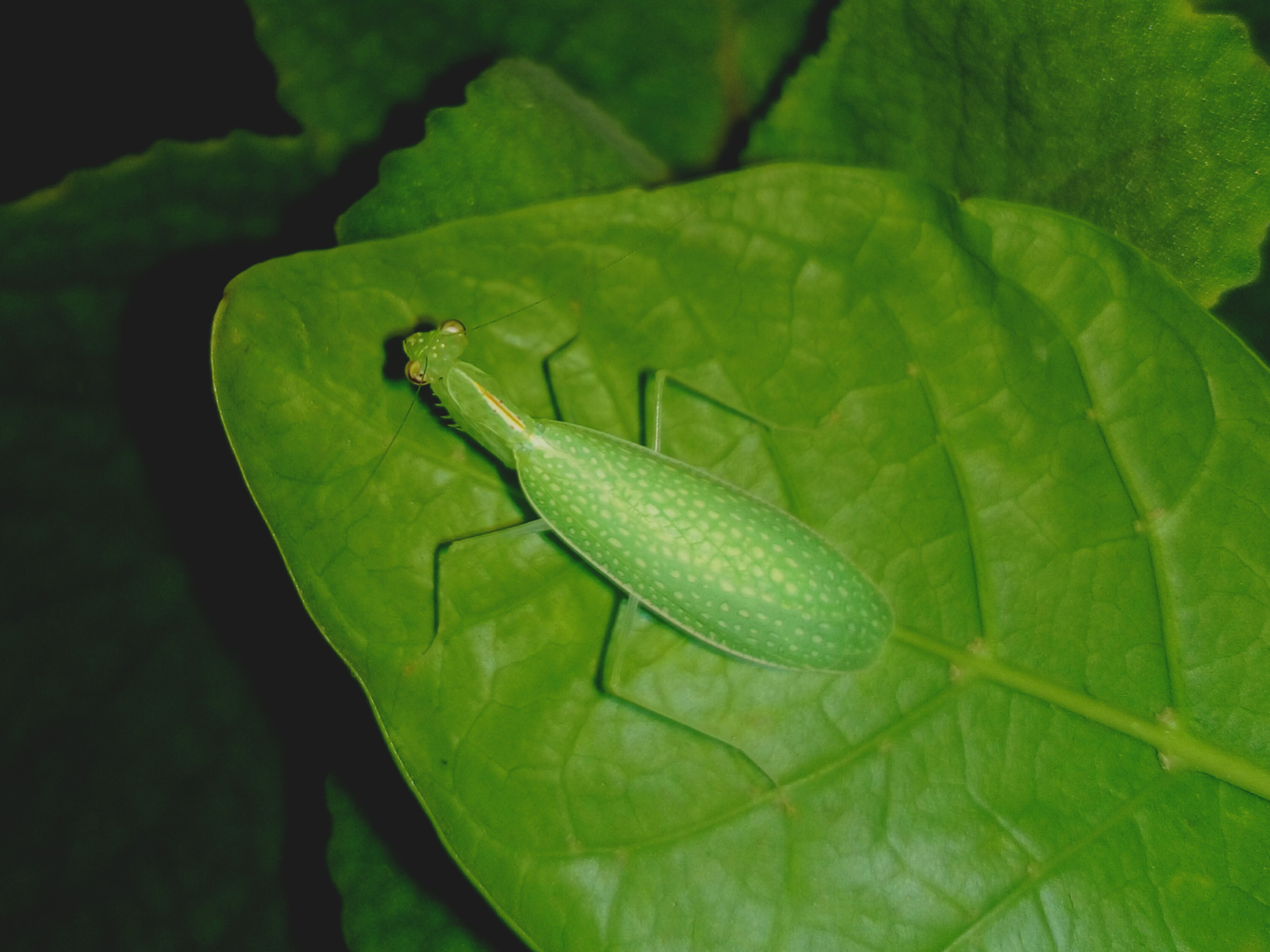
- Eomantis guttatipennis

Scientific classification
- Kingdom: Animalia
- Phylum: Arthropoda
- Clade: Pancrustacea
- Class: Insecta
- Order: Mantodea
- Family: Nanomantidae
- Subfamily: Tropidomantinae
- Genus: Eomantis; Giglio-Tos, 1915

= Eomantis =

Genus of praying mantises

Eomantis is a genus of praying mantis in the subfamily Tropidomantinae and tribe Tropidomantini, with species recorded from Asia.

== Species ==
The species in this restored genus were previously placed as a subgenus of Tropidomantis. The Mantodea Species File lists:

- Eomantis guttatipennis Stal, 1877 – type species
- Eomantis iridipennis Westwood, 1889
- Eomantis yunnanensis Wang, 1993
