= Bolbena =

Scientific classification
- Kingdom: Animalia
- Phylum: Arthropoda
- Clade: Pancrustacea
- Class: Insecta
- Order: Mantodea
- Family: Nanomantidae
- Tribe: Hapalomantini
- Genus: Bolbena; Giglio-Tos, 1915

Genus of praying mantises

Bolbena is a genus of praying mantises native to Africa. It includes the following species:

- Bolbena assimilis
- Bolbena hottentotta
- Bolbena maraisi
- Bolbena minor
- Bolbena minutissima
- Bolbena orientalis

== See also ==
- List of mantis genera and species
