= Calofulcinia =

Scientific classification
- Kingdom: Animalia
- Phylum: Arthropoda
- Clade: Pancrustacea
- Class: Insecta
- Order: Mantodea
- Family: Nanomantidae
- Tribe: Fulciniini
- Genus: Calofulcinia; Giglio-Tos, 1915

Species
- see text

Synonyms
- Burgersia Werner, 1928; Rawarena Tindale, 1930

Genus of praying mantises

Calofulcinia is a genus of praying mantises in the family Nanomantidae.

== Species ==
- Calofulcinia australis
- Calofulcinia elegans
- Calofulcinia integra
- Calofulcinia oxynota
- Calofulcinia paraoxypila
- Calofulcinia vidua
- Calofulcinia viridula
