= Gyromantis occidentalis =

Eastern bark mantis

Scientific classification
- Kingdom: Animalia
- Phylum: Arthropoda
- Clade: Pancrustacea
- Class: Insecta
- Order: Mantodea
- Family: Nanomantidae
- Genus: Gyromantis
- Species: G. occidentalis

Binomial name
- Gyromantis occidentalis Sjostedt, 1918

Species of praying mantis

Gyromantis occidentalis, commonly known as the eastern bark mantis, is a species of mantis found in Australia.

== See also ==
- List of Australian stick insects and mantids
- List of mantis genera and species
