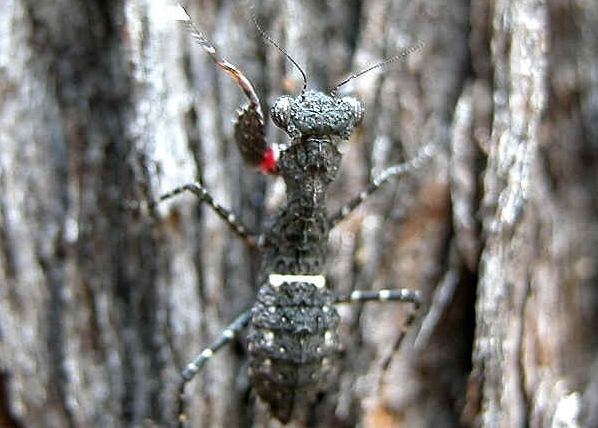
- Boxer bark mantis showing red warning colours

Scientific classification
- Kingdom: Animalia
- Phylum: Arthropoda
- Clade: Pancrustacea
- Class: Insecta
- Order: Mantodea
- Family: Nanomantidae
- Subtribe: Paraoxypilina
- Genus: Paraoxypilus; Saussure, 1870

= Paraoxypilus =

Genus of praying mantises

Paraoxypilus is a genus of mantis, known as the boxer bark mantises. They are native to Australia and Oceania.

== Description ==
This genus gets its name from the unusual way it acts like and resembles a boxer. Boxer bark mantises are black with hints of grey and white. They can mimic an ant due to its small size and its ant-like abdomen and small bumpy thorax. It does this to avoid predators and is excellent at camouflage.

The insects reach 2–3 cm (0.8–1.2 in) long as adults, while small nymphs are only 3 mm (0.1 in).

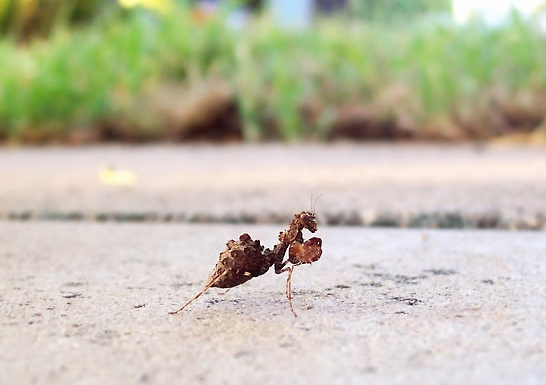
boxer bark mantis

Although some mantises are kept as pets, this genus of mantis is generally not, due to the difficulties presented by its small size.

== See also ==
- List of Australian stick insects and mantids
- Mantises of Oceania
