= Unicorn mantis =

Unicorn mantis is a common name for several species of praying mantis across different genera with horn-like protrusions on their heads including:

- Phthersigena unicornis (Timor unicorn mantis)
- Phyllovates chlorophaea (Texas unicorn mantis, Mexican unicorn mantis)
- Pseudovates arizonae (Arizona unicorn mantis)
- Zoolea (Paraguay unicorn mantis, etc.)

== See also ==
- List of mantis genera and species
