= Tropidomantis =

- Tropidomantis tenera

Scientific classification
- Kingdom: Animalia
- Phylum: Arthropoda
- Clade: Pancrustacea
- Class: Insecta
- Order: Mantodea
- Family: Nanomantidae
- Subfamily: Tropidomantinae
- Genus: Tropidomantis; Stål, 1877

Genus of praying mantises

Tropidomantis is a genus of praying mantis in the family Nanomantidae, with species recorded from Asia and the Pacific islands.

== Species ==
Three species in the restored genus Eomantis were previously placed here as a subgenus. The Mantodea Species File now lists the following species:

- Tropidomantis gressitti Tinkham, 1937
- Tropidomantis kawaharai Brannoch, 2018
- Tropidomantis tenera (Stål, 1858) – type species
