= Melania (Amorgos) =

Ancient town on the island of Amorgos

Melania (Ancient Greek: Μελανία) was an ancient town on the island of Amorgos.

The site of Melania is unlocated.
