= Nanomantinae =

Scientific classification
- Kingdom: Animalia
- Phylum: Arthropoda
- Clade: Pancrustacea
- Class: Insecta
- Order: Mantodea
- Family: Nanomantidae
- Subfamily: Nanomantinae

Subfamily of praying mantises

Nanomantinae is a praying mantis subfamily in the new (2019) family Nanomantidae. The tribe Nanomantini was placed here, but these and other genera have been reassigned.

== Genera ==
The Mantodea Species File lists:

1. Miromantis Giglio-Tos, 1927
2. Nanomantis Saussure, 1871
3. Ormomantis Giglio-Tos, 1915
4. Oxymantis Werner, 1931
5. Parananomantis Mukherjee, 1995
6. Sceptuchus Hebard, 1920
