= Epsomantis =

Scientific classification
- Kingdom: Animalia
- Phylum: Arthropoda
- Clade: Pancrustacea
- Class: Insecta
- Order: Mantodea
- Family: Nanomantidae
- Genus: Epsomantis; Giglio-Tos, 1915
- Species: E. tortricoides

Binomial name
- Epsomantis tortricoides (De Haan, 1842)

Synonyms
- Mantis tortricoides de Haan, 1842

Genus of praying mantises

Epsomantis is a monotypic genus of mantis in the new (2019) family Nanomantidae. It represented by the single species, Epsomantis tortricoides.

== Range ==
North Borneo, Java.

== See also ==
- List of mantis genera and species
