= Cliomantis =

Scientific classification
- Kingdom: Animalia
- Phylum: Arthropoda
- Clade: Pancrustacea
- Class: Insecta
- Order: Mantodea
- Family: Nanomantidae
- Subtribe: Paraoxypilina
- Genus: Cliomantis; Giglio-Tos, 1913

Genus of praying mantises

Cliomantis is a genus of praying mantises in the family Nanomantidae.

== See also ==
- List of mantis genera and species
