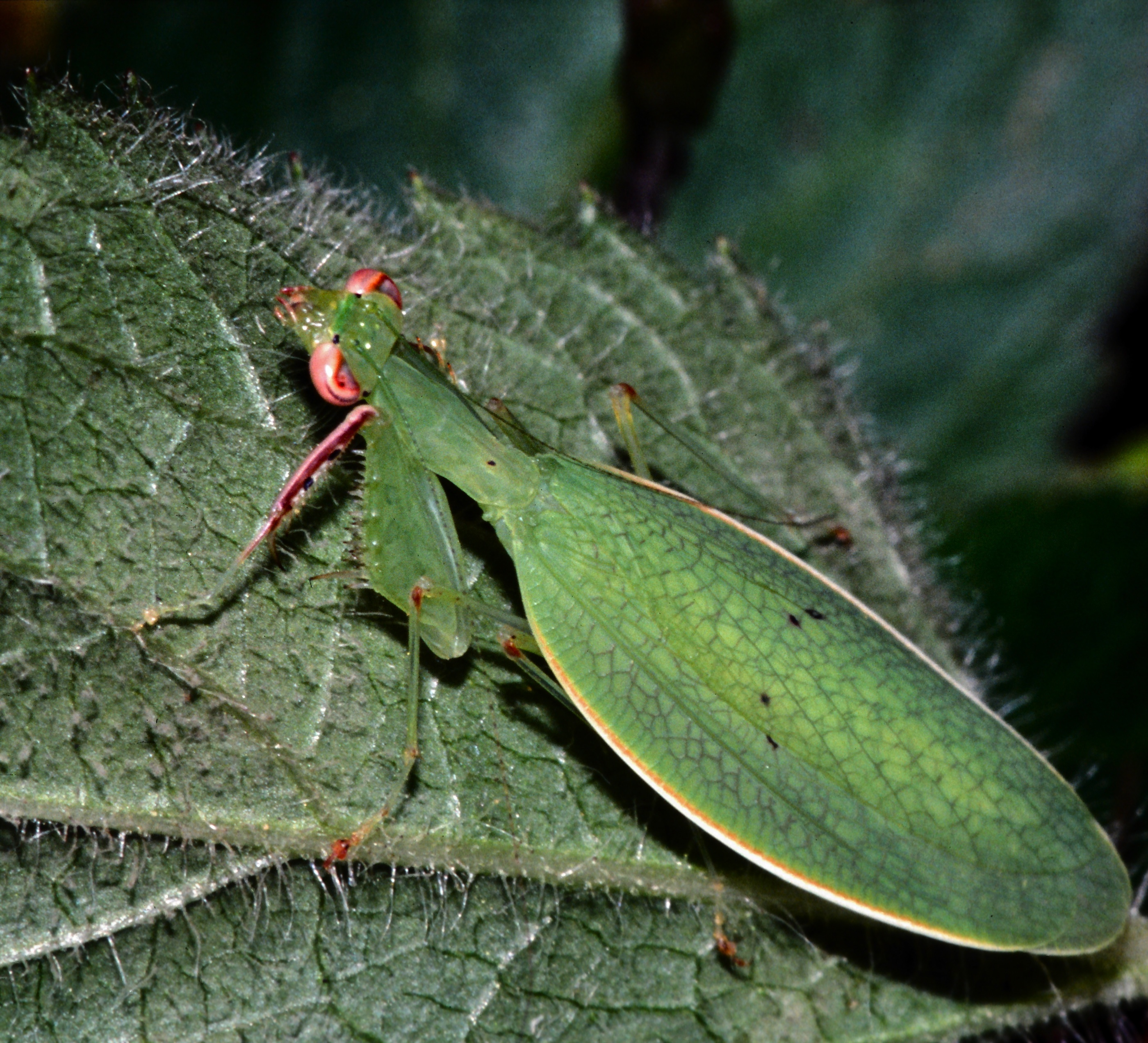
- Hyalomantis punctata

Scientific classification
- Kingdom: Animalia
- Phylum: Arthropoda
- Clade: Pancrustacea
- Class: Insecta
- Order: Mantodea
- Clade: Nanomantodea
- Superfamily: Nanomantoidea
- Family: Nanomantidae; Brunner de Wattenwyl, 1893

Subfamilies and tribes
- See text

= Nanomantidae =

Family of praying mantises

The Nanomantidae are a family of praying mantises, based on the type genus Nanomantis. As part of a major revision of mantid taxonomy, genera and tribes have been moved here, substantially replacing the old family Iridopterygidae.

The new placement is in superfamily Nanomantoidea (of group Cernomantodea) and infraorder Schizomantodea. The recorded distribution of genera includes: Africa including Madagascar, the Himalayas, SE Asia through to Australia and Pacific islands.

== Subfamilies, tribes and selected genera ==
The Mantodea Species File lists four subfamilies:

=== Fulciniinae ===
- tribe Fulciniini
  - Calofulcinia Giglio-Tos, 1915
  - Fulcinia Stal, 1877
  - Hedigerella Werner, 1933
  - Ima Tindale, 1924
  - Inimia Connors, 2023
  - Machairima Beier, 1965
  - Nannofulcinia Beier, 1965
  - Papugalepsus Werner, 1928
  - Pilomantis Giglio-Tos, 1915
  - Tylomantis Westwood, 1889
- tribe Neomantini
  - Kongobatha Hebard, 1920
  - Neomantis Giglio-Tos, 1915
- tribe Paraoxypilini (Australasia, Oceania):
  - subtribe Bolbina
    - Bolbe Stal, 1877
    - Papubolbe Beier, 1965
  - subtribe Paraoxypilina
    - Cliomantis Giglio-Tos, 1913
    - Exparoxypilus Beier, 1929
    - Gyromantis Giglio-Tos, 1913
    - Metoxypilus Giglio-Tos, 1913
    - Myrmecomantis Giglio-Tos, 1913
    - Nesoxypilus Beier, 1965
    - Paraoxypilus Saussure, 1870
    - Phthersigena Stal, 1871
- tribe Stenomantini
  - Ciulfina Giglio-Tos, 1915
  - Fulciniola Giglio-Tos, 1915
  - Stenomantis Saussure, 1871

=== Hapalomantinae ===
- tribe Hapalomantini: mainland Africa - genera:
  - Bolbena Giglio-Tos, 1915
  - Bolbula Giglio-Tos, 1915
  - Hapalogymnes Kaltenbach, 1996
  - Hapalomantis Saussure, 1871
- tribe Nilomantini: Madagascar
  - Chloromantis Kaltenbach, 1998
  - Cornucollis Brannoch & Svenson, 2016
  - Enicophlebia Westwood, 1889
  - Hyalomantis Giglio-Tos, 1915
  - Ilomantis Giglio-Tos, 1915
  - Melomantis Giglio-Tos, 1915
  - Negromantis Giglio-Tos, 1915
  - Nilomantis Werner, 1907
  - Platycalymma Westwood, 1889

=== Nanomantinae ===
Selected genera:

- Miromantis Giglio-Tos, 1927
- Nanomantis Saussure, 1871 - type genus
- Ormomantis Giglio-Tos, 1915

=== Tropidomantinae ===
Selected genera:

- tribe Epsomantini
  - Epsomantis Giglio-Tos, 1915
- tribe Tropidomantini
  - Eomantis Giglio-Tos, 1915
  - Tropidomantis Stal, 1877
