= Metallyticus fallax =

Scientific classification
- Domain: Eukaryota
- Kingdom: Animalia
- Phylum: Arthropoda
- Class: Insecta
- Order: Mantodea
- Family: Metallyticidae
- Genus: Metallyticus
- Species: M. fallax

Binomial name
- Metallyticus fallax Giglio-Tos, 1917

Species of praying mantis

Metallyticus fallax is a species of praying mantis found in Southeast Asia. It has an iridescent appearance. It is very similar to Metallyticus splendidus.

== Biology and Ecology ==
Metallyticus fallax has several plesiomorphic morphological traits, such as its short prothorax and lack of discoidal spines. It has more ventral cervical sclerites than Metallyticus splendidus.

This mantis tends to rest underneath the bark of trees, feeding on butterflies, termites, flies, and mainly on cockroaches. They also chase after their prey, rather than ambushing them like most mantis species.
