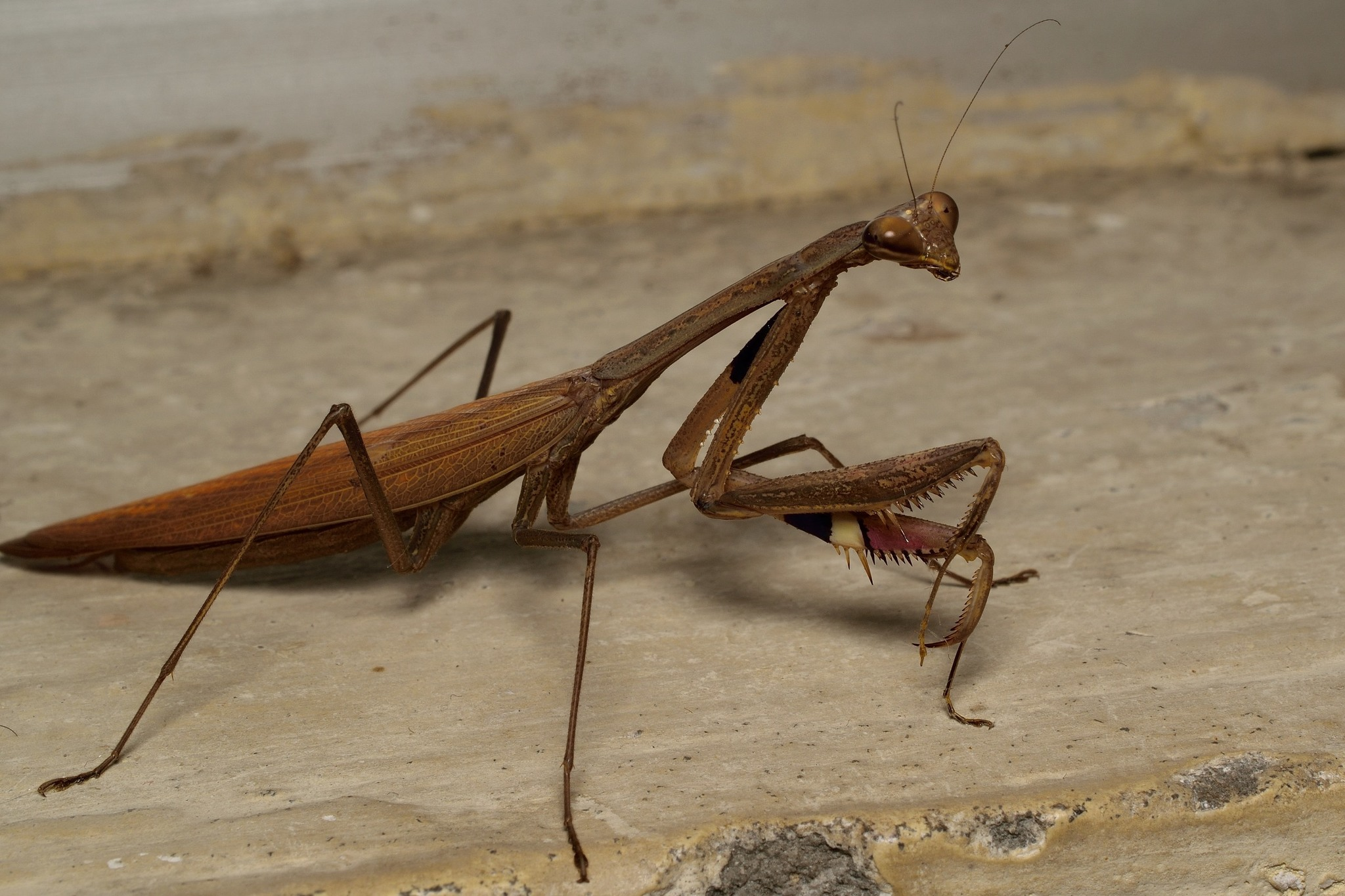

Scientific classification
- Kingdom: Animalia
- Phylum: Arthropoda
- Clade: Pancrustacea
- Class: Insecta
- Order: Mantodea
- Family: Mantidae
- Genus: Statilia
- Species: S. maculata

Binomial name
- Statilia maculata (Thunberg, 1784)

Subspecies
- Statilia maculata continentalis (Werner, 1935); Statilia maculata maculata (Thunberg, 1784)
- Occurrence Limited occurrence

= Statilia maculata =

Species of praying mantis

Statilia maculata, common name Asian jumping mantis or "小蟷螂", ko-kamakiri (Japanese meaning "small mantis") or "좀사마귀", jom-sa-ma-gui (Korean meaning "small mantis"), is a species of mantis native to Asia that can be found in Russia, China, Japan, Korea, and Sri Lanka.

== Description ==
Males are 40–50 mm in length as adults. Females are 45–58 mm in length as adults.

== Taxonomy ==
The species was first described from the genus Mantis by Swedish naturalist Carl Peter Thunberg in 1784, who described the mantis as being from eastern India.

== Subspecies ==
- S. m. maculata China, Japan (Honshu, Shikoku, Kyushu), Taiwan, India (Andhra Pradesh, Arunachal Pradesh, Assam, Bihar, Himachal Pradesh, Kerala, Madhya Pradesh, Maharashtra, Meghalaya, Orissa, Sikkim, Uttar Pradesh, West Bengal), Java, Borneo, Nepal, Myanmar, New Guinea, Sri Lanka, Thailand, Korea
- S. m. continentalis India (Uttar Pradesh)

== As a food ==
The species is eaten in Japan's Nagano prefecture, where the wings, limbs, and guts are removed prior to being cooked with sweetened soy sauce. The mantises' egg cases are also used medicinally in Japan and China.

== Genetics ==
Statilia maculata has a C-value of 3.05.

== Gallery ==
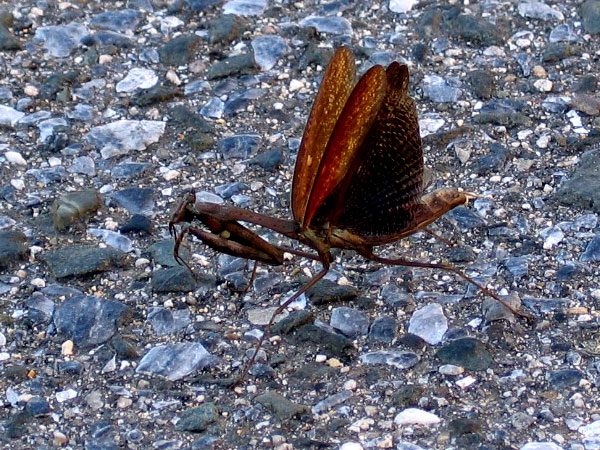
Adult female

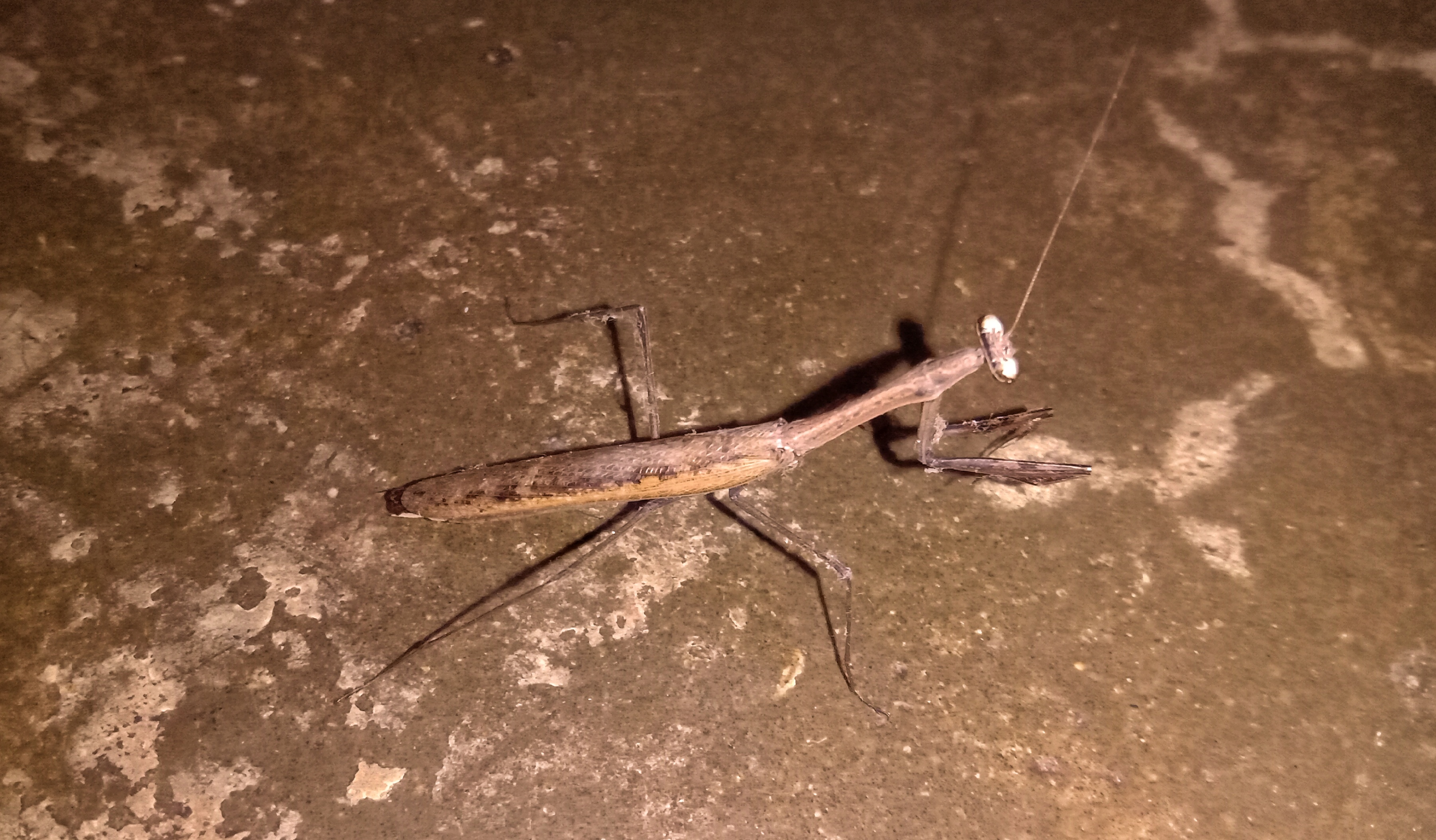
Asian jumping mantis at night, in West Bengal, India

== See also ==
- List of mantis genera and species
