= Baissomantidae =

Baissomantidae Temporal range: Aptian–Cenomanian

Scientific classification
- Kingdom: Animalia
- Phylum: Arthropoda
- Clade: Pancrustacea
- Class: Insecta
- Order: Mantodea
- Family: †Baissomantidae; Gratshev and Zherikhin 1993

Genera
- †Baissomantis; †Labradormantis

Extinct family of insects

Baissomantidae is an extinct family of primitive mantises known from the Cretaceous period. There are two known genera and three species, which are Baissomantis, of which the species are Baissomantis maculata & B. picta, known from the Early Cretaceous Zaza Formation of Buryatia, Russia, and Labradormantis, which has only one species, Labradormantis guilbaulti from the mid Cretaceous (Cenomanian) Redmond Formation of Labrador, Canada. They are amongst the most primitive mantises known, only more advanced than Santanmantis.
