= Baissomantis =

Baissomantis Temporal range: Aptian

Scientific classification
- Kingdom: Animalia
- Phylum: Arthropoda
- Clade: Pancrustacea
- Class: Insecta
- Order: Mantodea
- Family: †Baissomantidae
- Genus: †Baissomantis; Gratshev & Zherikhin, 1994

Extinct genus of praying mantises

Baissomantis is an extinct genus of mantises in the family Baissomantidae. There are two described species of Baissomantis both of which are known from the Early Cretaceous Zaza Formation of Buryatia, Russia.

== Species ==
These two species belong to the genus Baissomantis:

- † Baissomantis maculata Gratshev & Zherikhin, 1994
- † Baissomantis picta Gratshev & Zherikhin, 1994
