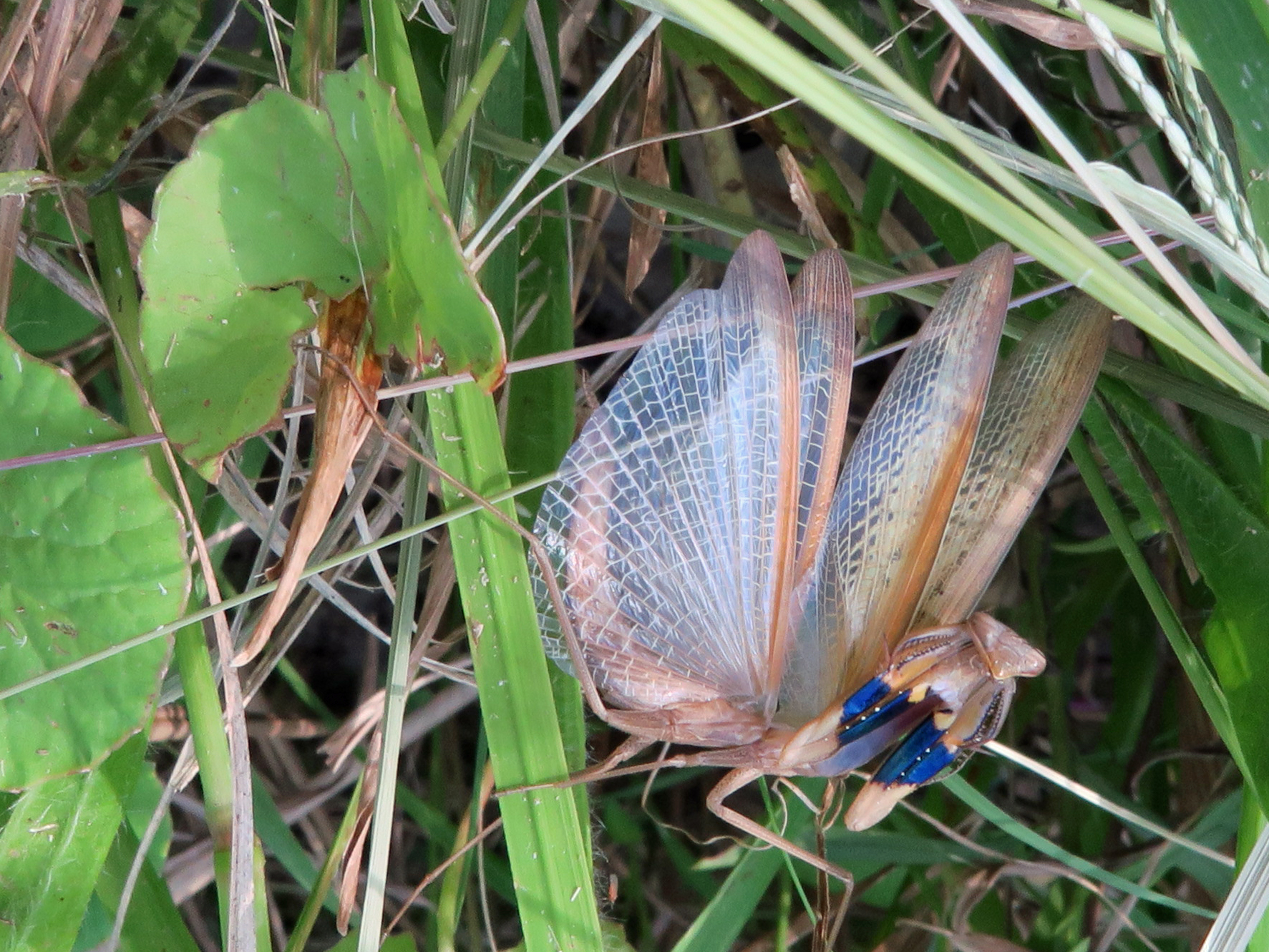
- Statilia apicalis imago in Australia

Scientific classification
- Kingdom: Animalia
- Phylum: Arthropoda
- Clade: Pancrustacea
- Class: Insecta
- Order: Mantodea
- Family: Mantidae
- Genus: Statilia
- Species: S. apicalis

Binomial name
- Statilia apicalis Saussure, 1871

Synonyms
- Statilia guineensis Chopard, 1954

= Statilia apicalis =

Species of praying mantis

Statilia apicalis is a far-ranging species of mantis found in Asia, Africa, and Oceania.

Its range includes Australia, New Guinea, New Caledonia, India, Sulawesi, China, Sumba, Timor, the Philippines, Ghana, Guinea, and the Congo River area.

== See also ==
- List of mantis genera and species
