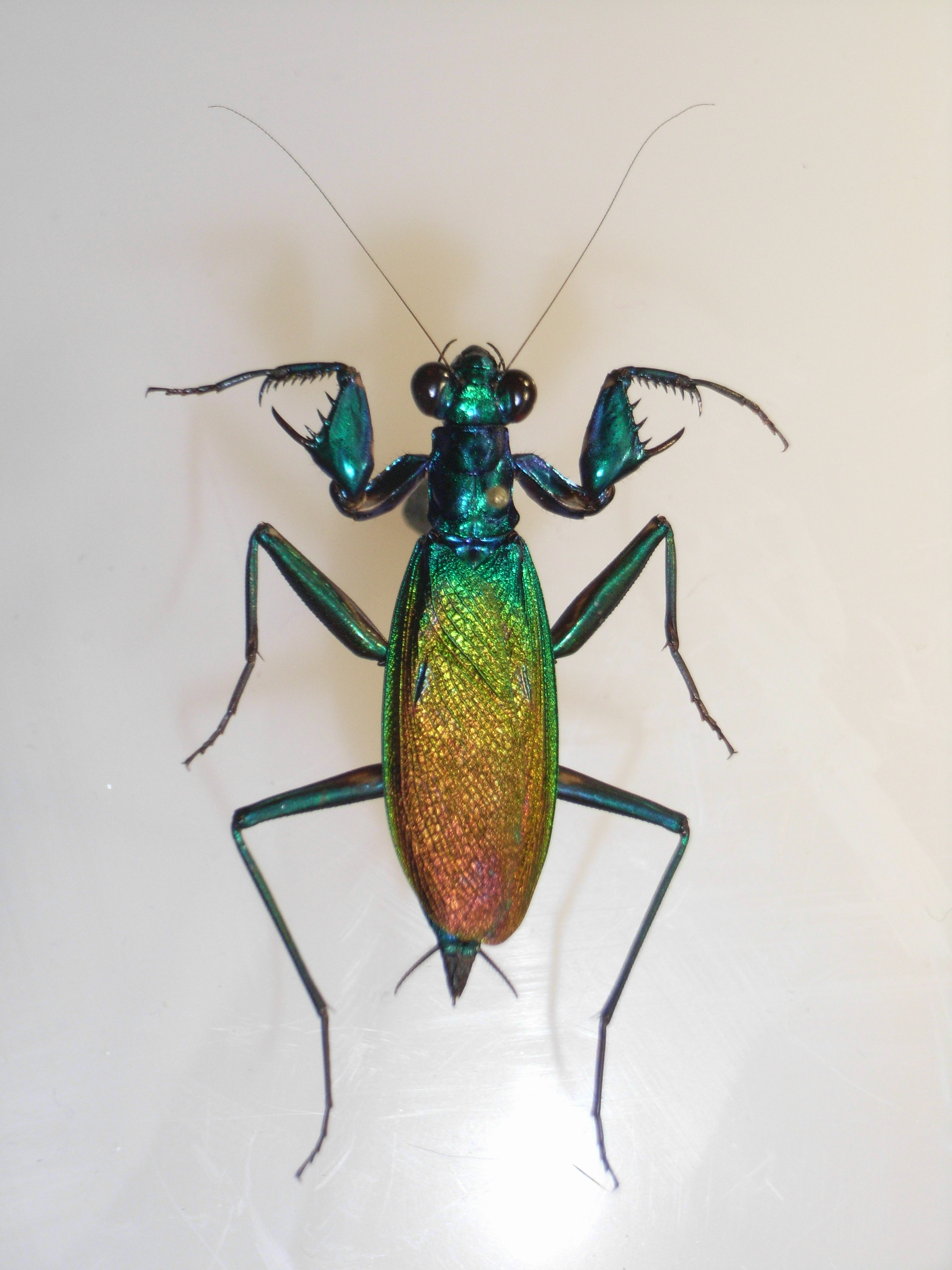
- Metallyticus splendidus

Scientific classification
- Kingdom: Animalia
- Phylum: Arthropoda
- Clade: Pancrustacea
- Class: Insecta
- Order: Mantodea
- Family: Metallyticidae
- Genus: Metallyticus
- Species: M. splendidus

Binomial name
- Metallyticus splendidus Westwood, 1835

= Metallyticus splendidus =

Species of praying mantis

Metallyticus splendidus (informally known as the iridescent bark mantis) is a rare species of praying mantis found in Southeast Asia. It has an iridescent appearance.

== Description ==
M. splendidus was originally described by J. O. Westwood in 1835 as having a short, oval-shaped body, a blunt head, thick anterior femora, round eyes, and simple antennae. In the same work, Westwood described the genus Metallyticus as distinct from other mantis genera by the iridescent color, short pronotum, and the exposed tip of the abdomen when wings are closed. Ermanno Giglio-Tos added additional descriptions of M. splendidus in 1927, noting the presence of yellow marks on the legs and vertex, and providing a description of the smoky, blackish wings.

Males and females of M. splendidus differ in coloration (males are blue-violet and females are golden-green) and size (females are around 31 millimetres (1.2 in) long whiles males measure 21 millimetres (0.83 in)).

M. splendidus has been described as a basal mantis, though some systematists argue that the application of this term to extant taxa can be misleading. Several morphological traits of M. splendidus are plesiomorphic, such as its short prothorax and lack of discoidal spines. M. splendidus also have less ventral cervical sclerites than other species in their genus. Other traits of M. splendidus and other Metallyticus species are autapomorphic, including the metallic coloration and large outer spine on the front femur. M. splendidus has been represented in morphological and molecular phylogenies, which have shown it to be nested within the monophyletic family Metallycidae, though the position of this family with respect to other mantis lineages remains in question.

== Reproduction ==
The egg of M. splendidus is roughly shaped like a prolate spheroid, with a slight anterior constriction and concave dorsal side. Eggs measure about 3.2 millimetres (0.13 in) long and 1 millimetre (0.039 in) wide. A U-shaped fissure from which larvae rupture the eggshell, known as the hatching line, is present at the anterior pole of the egg. When raised at room temperature, eggs typically take 80–90 days to hatch. Eggs are laid in egg cases (öothecae) in groups of 20–30.

== Behavior and Ecology ==
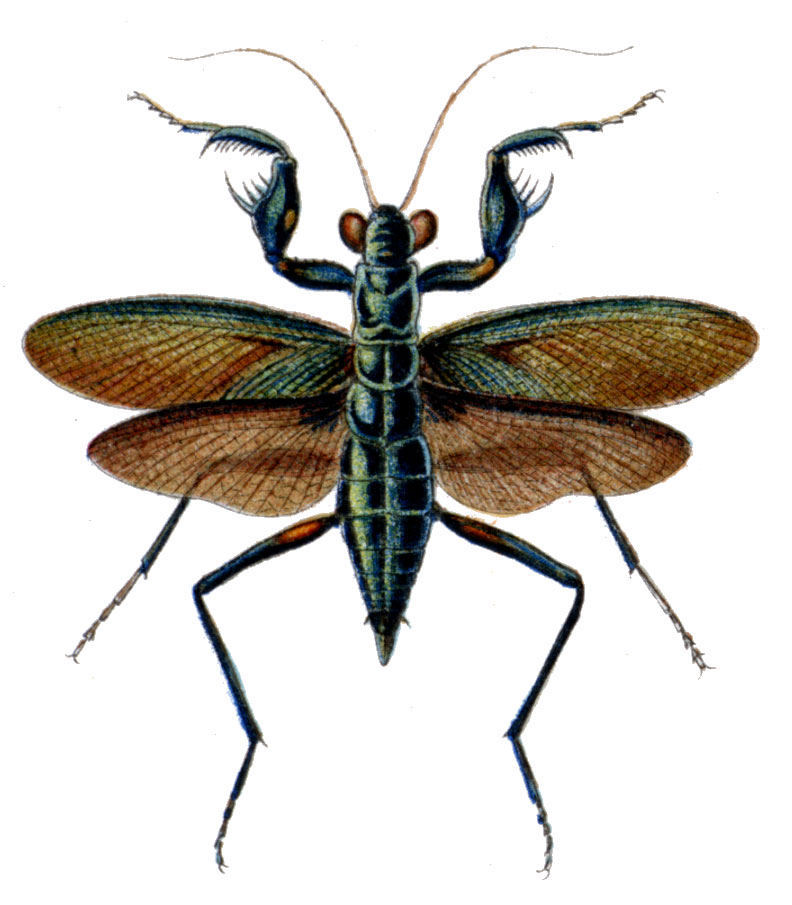

The iridescent bark mantis is an active hunter both day and night. Its usual habitat is dead trees (e.g. Vatica rassak), where its prey are likely to be found. While nymphs have been reported on the surface of bark, adult M. splendidus individuals tend to be found underneath the bark, feeding on butterflies, termites, flies, and mainly cockroaches. They typically dart to catch prey and bring them back to a crevice to feed, rather than ambushing them like most mantis species. When running, this species also uses all six legs rather than holding the foremost pair aloft like many other mantises.

== Exotic Pet Trade ==
The iridescent bark mantis is sold as an exotic pet, though vendors report it is difficult to raise. This species survives in temperatures of 25–30 °C (77–86 °F) and at a humidity of 60-70% during the day, and 70-90% humidity during the night, and is non-cannibalistic.

== See also ==
- List of mantis genera and species
