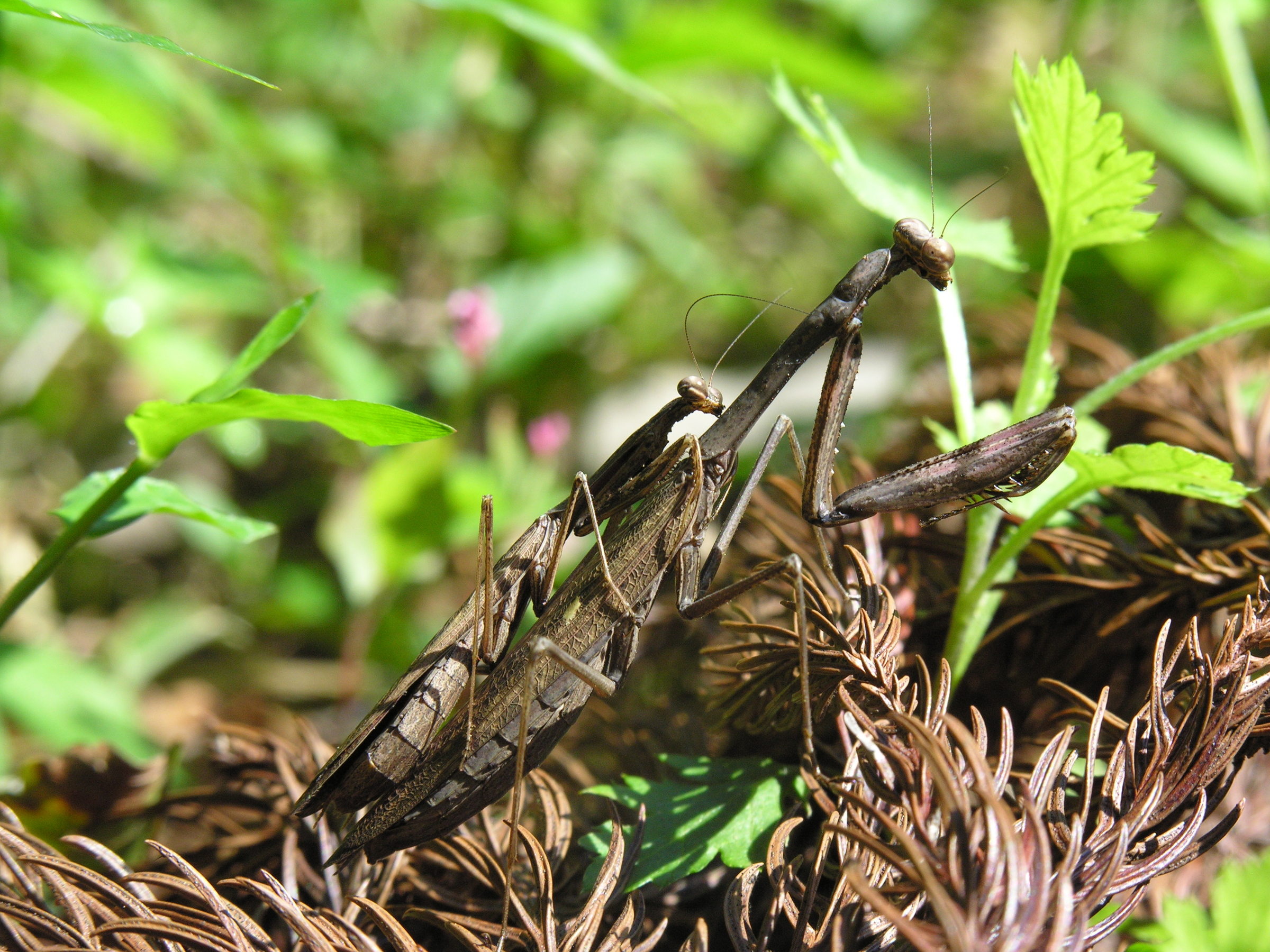
- Statilia maculata mating pair

Scientific classification
- Kingdom: Animalia
- Phylum: Arthropoda
- Clade: Pancrustacea
- Class: Insecta
- Order: Mantodea
- Family: Mantidae
- Tribe: Mantini
- Genus: Statilia; Stål, 1877

Species
- See text

= Statilia =

Genus of praying mantis

Statilia is a genus of praying mantis in the subfamily Mantinae, erected by Carl Stål in 1877. Statilia species live in Australia, Africa, Asia and Pacific islands and species often resemble dead or living grass.

== Species ==
The Mantodea Species File lists:

1. Statilia agresta Zheng, 1987
2. Statilia apicalis Saussure, 1871
3. Statilia chayuensis Zhang, 1983
4. Statilia flavobrunnea Zhang, 1984
5. Statilia maculata Thunberg, 1784 —"Asian Jumping Mantis", Southeast Asia and North America
  1. S. maculata maculata Thungberg, 1784
  2. S. maculata continentalis Werner, 1935
6. Statilia major Werner, 1922
7. Statilia nemoralis Saussure 1870 - type species
8. Statilia nobilis Brunner, 1893
9. Statilia occibivittata Yang 1997
10. Statilia ocellata Uvarov, 1922
11. Statilia pallida Werner, 1922
12. Statilia spanis Wang, 1993
13. Statilia viridibrunnea Zhang, 1984

== See also ==
- List of mantis genera and species
- Chinese Mantis
