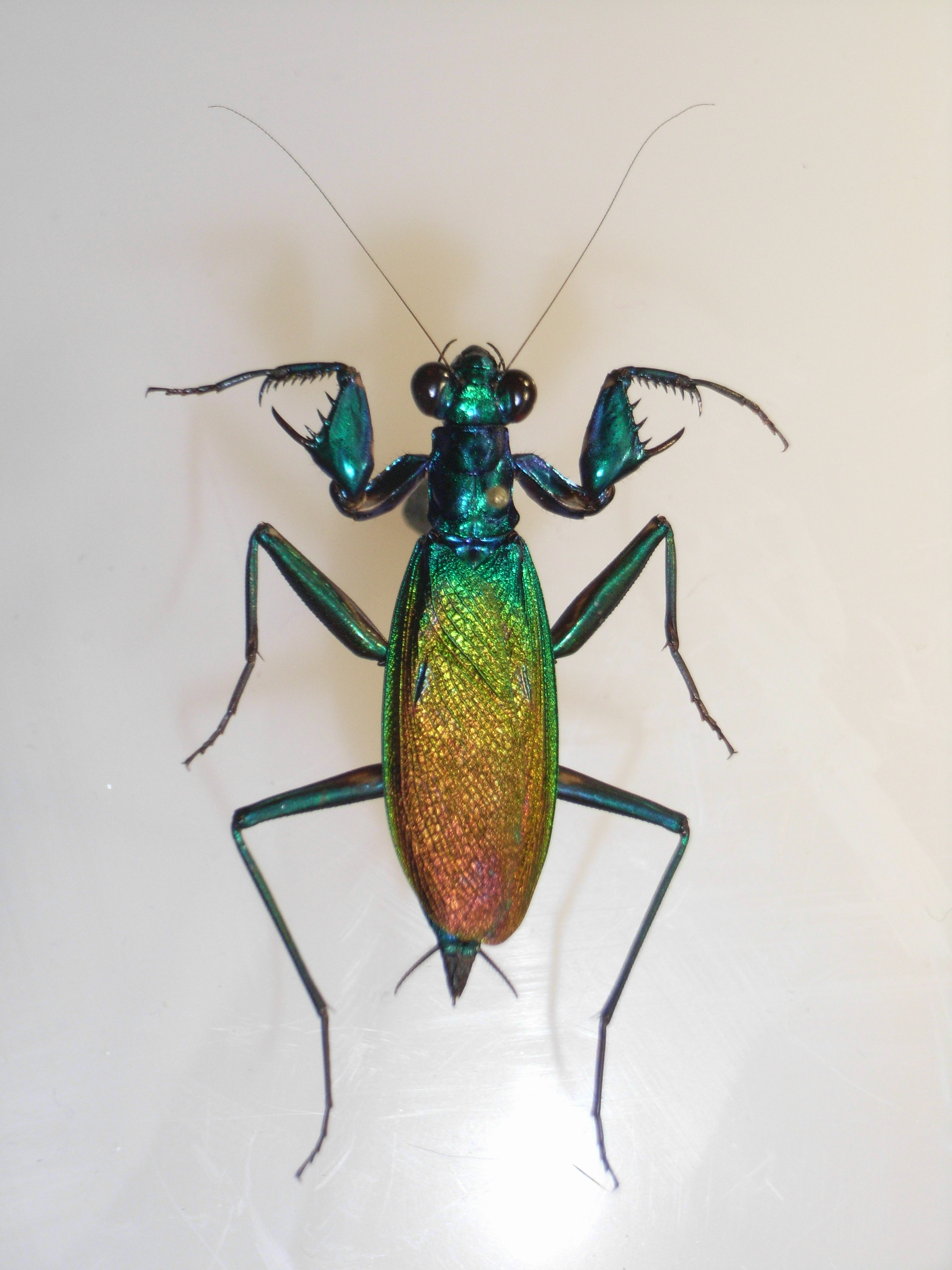
- Metallyticus splendidus

Scientific classification
- Kingdom: Animalia
- Phylum: Arthropoda
- Clade: Pancrustacea
- Class: Insecta
- Order: Mantodea
- Superfamily: Metallyticoidea; Giglio-Tos, 1917
- Family: Metallyticidae; Giglio-Tos, 1917
- Genus: Metallyticus; Westwood, 1835

Species
- See text

Synonyms
- Metalleutica Westwood, 1834

= Metallyticus =

Family of praying mantises

Metallyticus is a genus of praying mantis. It is the only genus in the monotypic family Metallyticidae. They are mostly found in South-East Asia. The species of the genus are dark, somewhat flattened and cockroach-like, and often with a cuticle that is reflective and metallic in appearance.

The phylogenetic position of Metallyticidae relative to other mantis families has been studied using both morphological and molecular characters, but consensus on its placement has not been achieved. Along with the genera Chaeteessa and Mantoida, Metallyticus is considered a member of the basal Mantodea, though some scientists consider the application of the term 'basal' to extant species to be misleading. Metallyticidae species have several autapomorphic traits, including their metallic coloration and the enlarged spine on their front legs. They also have many plesiomorphic traits, including a relatively short pronotum and full wings in both sexes.

Of the five species, M. splendidus and M. violaceus are the most abundant. Most specimens for scientific study have been found in Sumatra, Borneo, Java, and the Malay Peninsula.

Species in this family are distinct from other mantises in their method of prey capture; Metallyticus species typically dart to capture prey, remaining close to the ground, rather than waiting to ambush. These species are usually found in or under bark of decaying trees.

== Species ==
- Metallyticus fallax Giglio-Tos, 1917
- Metallyticus pallipes Giglio-Tos, 1917
- Metallyticus semiaeneus Westwood, 1889
- Metallyticus splendidus Westwood, 1835
- Metallyticus violaceus (Burmeister, 1838)
