= Cretomantidae =

Cretomantidae Temporal range: Aptian

Scientific classification
- Kingdom: Animalia
- Phylum: Arthropoda
- Clade: Pancrustacea
- Class: Insecta
- Order: Mantodea
- Family: †Cretomantidae

Extinct family of praying mantises

Cretomantidae is an extinct family of mantises in the order Mantodea. It contains at least one genus Cretomantis, which is known from the Early Cretaceous Zaza Formation of Buryatia, Russia. The genus Electromantis known from Late Cretaceous (Santonian) Taimyr amber of Russia was formerly placed in this family, but is currently considered incertae sedis within Mantodea.

== Genera ==
These two genera belong to the family Cretomantidae:

- † Cretomantis Gratshev & Zherikhin, 1994
- † Electromantis Gratshev & Zherikhin, 1994
