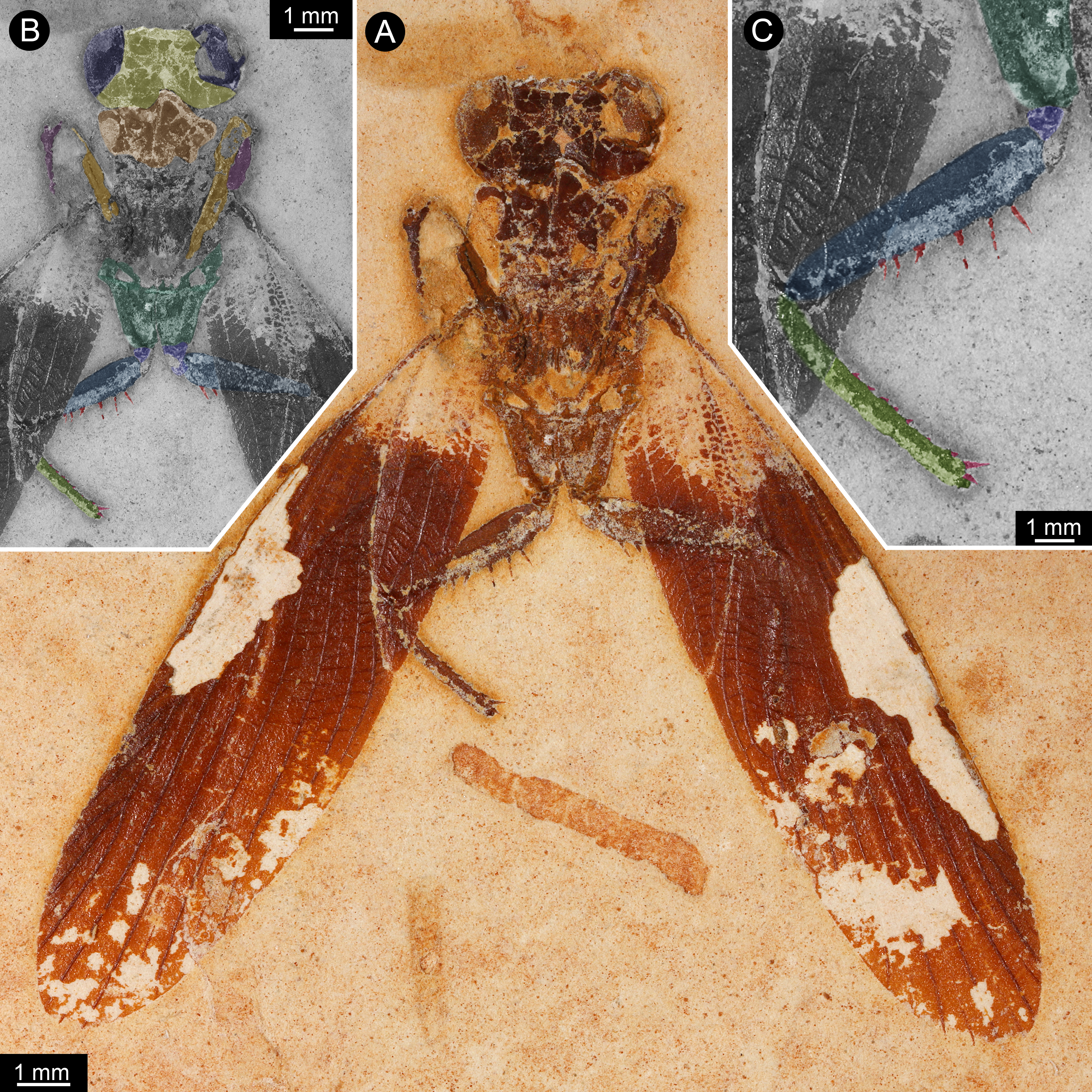
- Specimen MB.I.2068
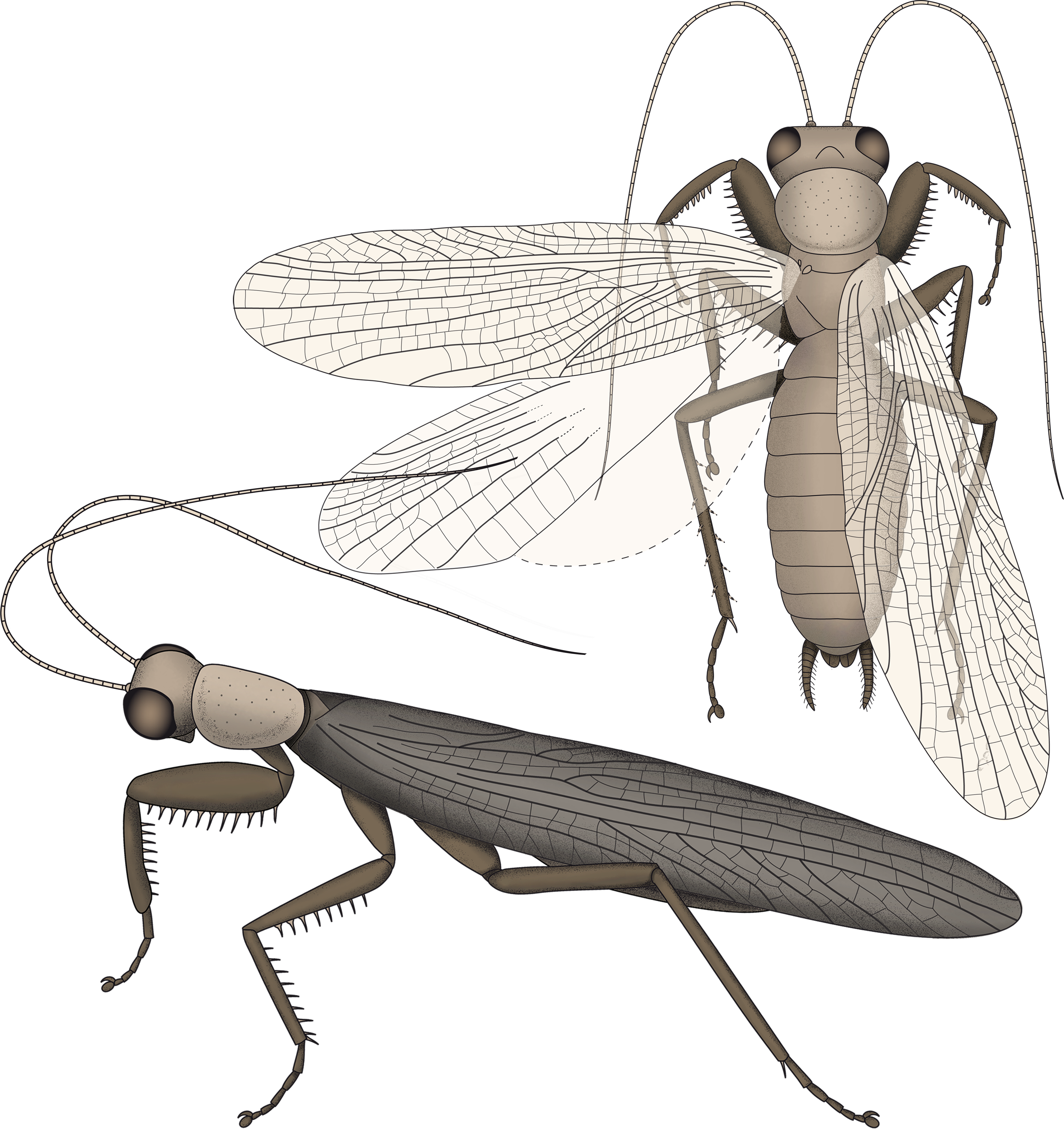
- Life restoration (Note: the spines on the second set of legs have been considered questionable by other authors)

Scientific classification
- Kingdom: Animalia
- Phylum: Arthropoda
- Clade: Pancrustacea
- Class: Insecta
- Order: Mantodea
- Family: †Santanmantidae; Grimaldi 2003
- Genus: †Santanmantis; Grimaldi, 2003
- Species: †S. axelrodi

Binomial name
- †Santanmantis axelrodi Grimaldi, 2003

= Santanmantis =

Santanmantis Temporal range: Aptian

Extinct genus of praying mantises

Santanmantis is an extinct genus of mantises, the sole genus in the family Santanmantidae. The only species, Santanmantis axelrodi, is known from the Crato Formation of Brazil, dating to the late Aptian stage of the Early Cretaceous. It is amongst the most primitive known lineages of mantis. Like other mantises, the forelegs are modified into spined raptorial appendages. When describing a new specimen in 2017, Hörnig, Haug and Haug proposed that the second set of legs also had spines similar to the forelegs, and also served a raptorial function, but that they were not visible in the fossil due to being broken off. However a response to this paper criticised this assumption, finding that it had little evidence from the fossil itself or from living mantises.
