= Euantha litturata =

Scientific classification
- Kingdom: Animalia
- Phylum: Arthropoda
- Class: Insecta
- Order: Diptera
- Family: Tachinidae
- Subfamily: Dexiinae
- Tribe: Sophiini
- Genus: Euantha
- Species: E. litturata

Binomial name
- Euantha litturata (Olivier, 1811)

Synonyms
- Ocyptera litturata Olivier, 1811; Dexia postica Olivier, 1811; Dexia dives Wulp, 1885; Ocyptera litturata Macquart, 1844; Sericocera pictipennis Macquart, 1843

Species of fly

Euantha litturata is a species of bristle fly in the family Tachinidae.

== Distribution ==
United States, Guatemala, Mexico.
