= Neoeuantha aucta =

Scientific classification
- Kingdom: Animalia
- Phylum: Arthropoda
- Class: Insecta
- Order: Diptera
- Family: Tachinidae
- Subfamily: Dexiinae
- Tribe: Sophiini
- Genus: Neoeuantha
- Species: N. aucta

Binomial name
- Neoeuantha aucta (Wiedemann, 1830)

Synonyms
- Dexia aucta Wiedemann, 1830

Species of fly

Neoeuantha aucta is a species of fly in the family Tachinidae.

== Distribution ==
Brazil.
