= Leptidosophia lutescens =

Scientific classification
- Kingdom: Animalia
- Phylum: Arthropoda
- Class: Insecta
- Order: Diptera
- Family: Tachinidae
- Subfamily: Dexiinae
- Tribe: Sophiini
- Genus: Leptidosophia
- Species: L. lutescens

Binomial name
- Leptidosophia lutescens Townsend, 1931

Species of fly

Leptidosophia lutescens is a species of fly in the family Tachinidae.

== Distribution ==
Peru.
