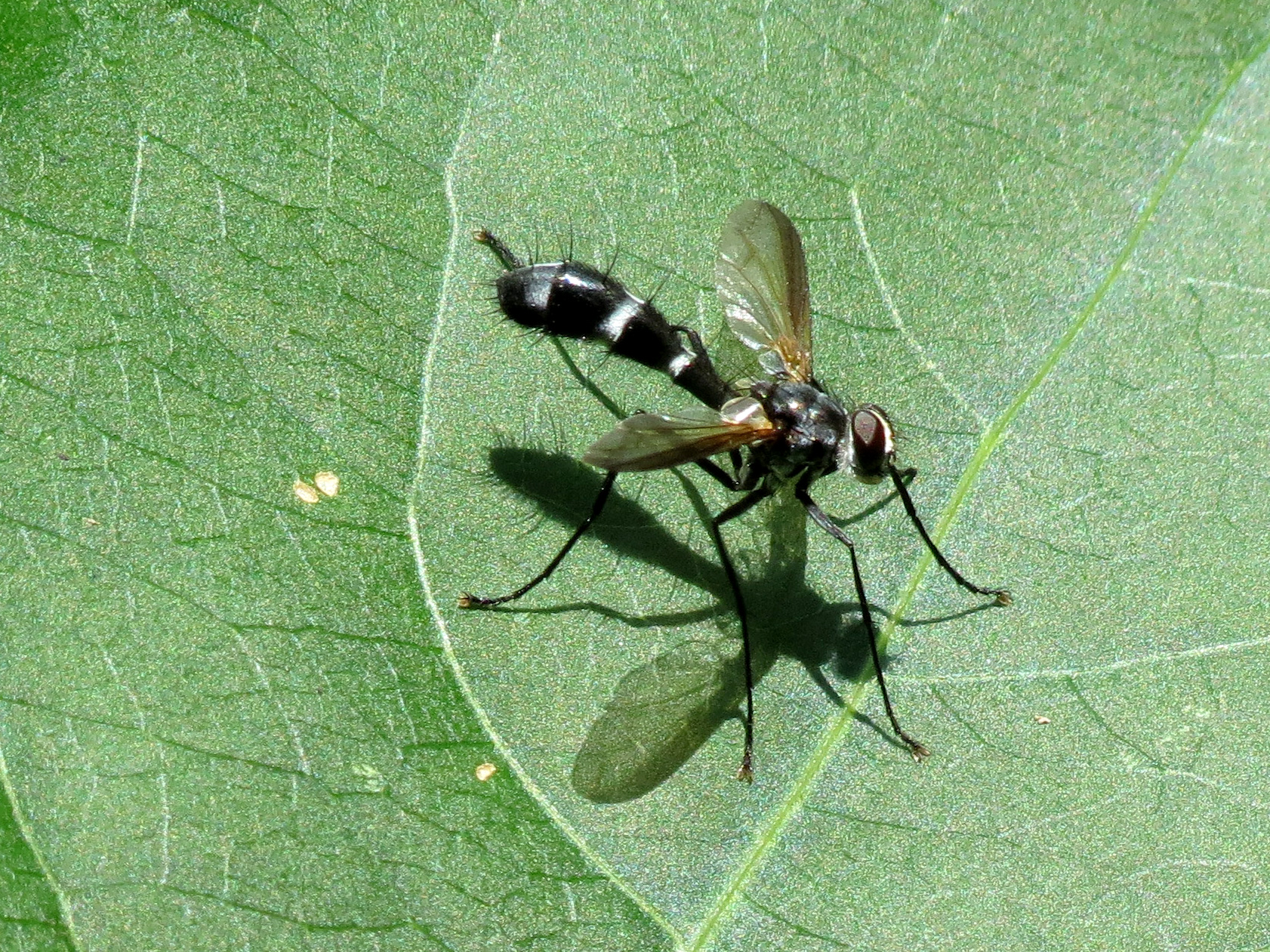

Scientific classification
- Kingdom: Animalia
- Phylum: Arthropoda
- Class: Insecta
- Order: Diptera
- Family: Tachinidae
- Subfamily: Dexiinae
- Tribe: Sophiini
- Genus: Cordyligaster
- Species: C. septentrionalis

Binomial name
- Cordyligaster septentrionalis Townsend, 1909

Synonyms
- Eurigaster septentrionalis Walker, 1866

= Cordyligaster septentrionalis =

Species of fly

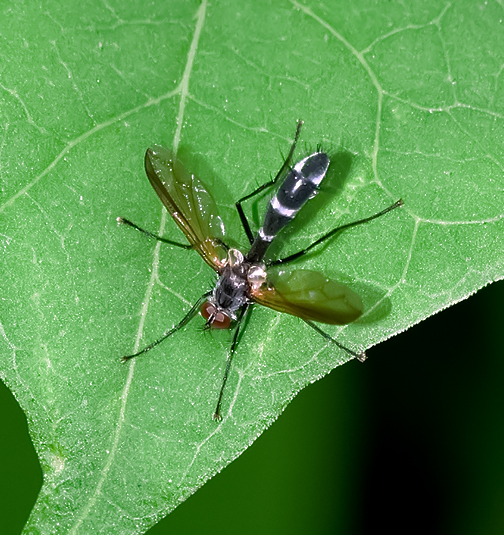
Cordyligaster septentrionalis dorsal view

Cordyligaster septentrionalis is a species of bristle fly in the family Tachinidae.

== Distribution ==
This species occurs in the United States.
