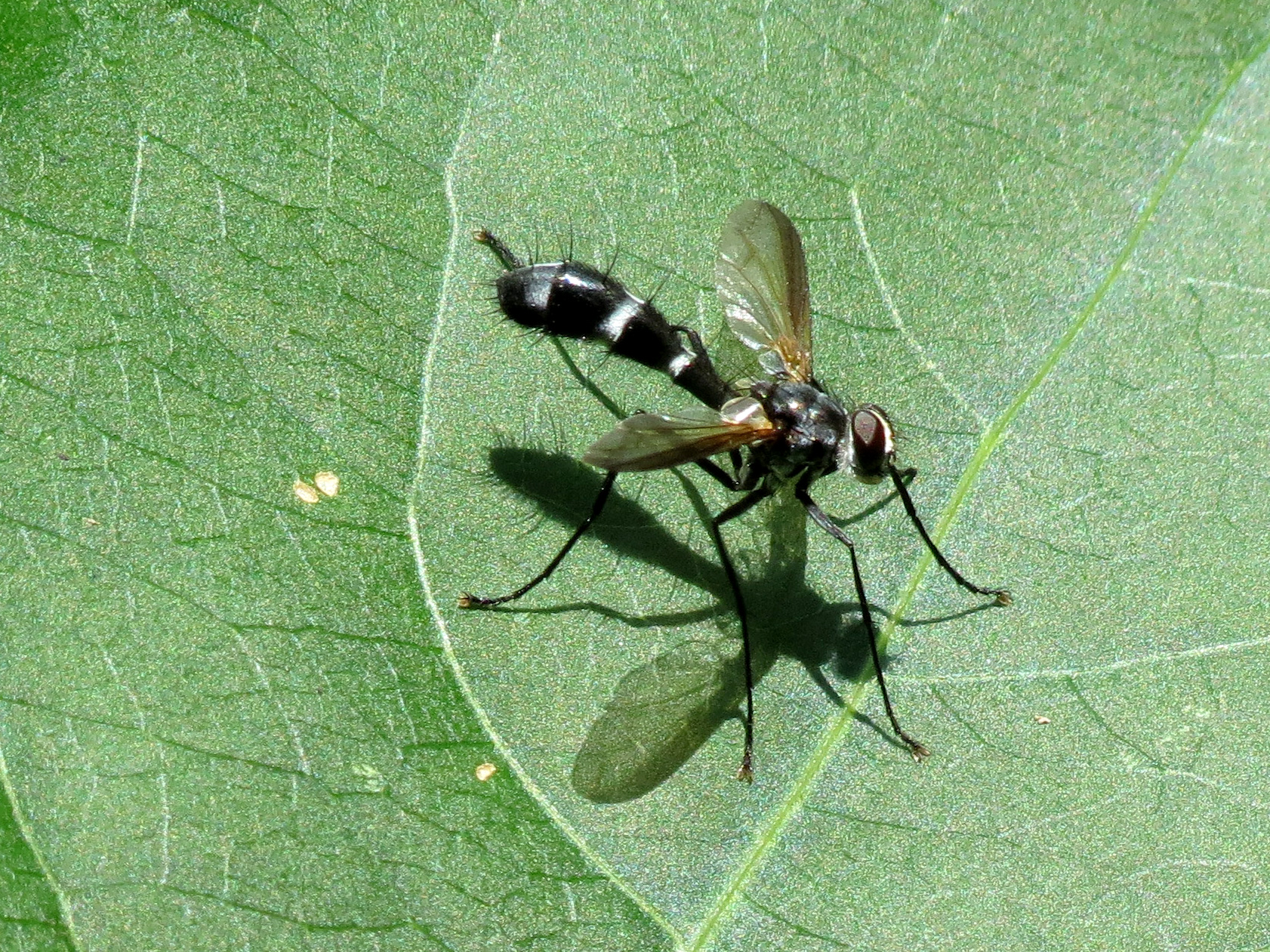
- Cordyligaster septentrionalis

Scientific classification
- Kingdom: Animalia
- Phylum: Arthropoda
- Class: Insecta
- Order: Diptera
- Family: Tachinidae
- Subfamily: Dexiinae
- Tribe: Sophiini
- Genus: Cordyligaster; Macquart, 1844

Type species
- Dexia petiolata Wiedemann, 1830

Synonyms
- Eucordyligaster Townsend, 1917; Eucordylidexia Townsend, 1915; Corduligaster Agassiz, 1846; Cordylidexia Giglio-Tos, 1894; Cordylogaster Agassiz, 1846; Megistogaster Macquart, 1851

= Cordyligaster =

Genus of flies

Cordyligaster is a genus of bristle flies in the family Tachinidae.

== Species ==
- Cordyligaster analis (Macquart, 1851)
- Cordyligaster ategulata Townsend, 1915
- Cordyligaster capellii Fleming & Wood, 2014
- Cordyligaster fuscifacies Bigot, 1888
- Cordyligaster fuscipennis (Macquart, 1851)
- Cordyligaster minuscula Wulp, 1891
- Cordyligaster nyomula Townsend, 1914
- Cordyligaster petiolata (Wiedemann, 1830)
- Cordyligaster septentrionalis Townsend, 1909
- Cordyligaster tipuliformis Walker, 1858
- Cordyligaster townsendi Guimarães, 1971
