= Sophiella =

Scientific classification
- Kingdom: Animalia
- Phylum: Arthropoda
- Class: Insecta
- Order: Diptera
- Family: Tachinidae
- Subfamily: Dexiinae
- Tribe: Sophiini
- Genus: Sophiella; Guimarães, 1982

Type species
- Sophiella lanei Guimarães, 1982

Genus of flies

Sophiella is a genus of flies in the family Tachinidae.

== Species ==
- Sophiella lanei Guimarães, 1982

== Distribution ==
Brazil.
