= Neoeuantha =

Scientific classification
- Kingdom: Animalia
- Phylum: Arthropoda
- Class: Insecta
- Order: Diptera
- Family: Tachinidae
- Subfamily: Dexiinae
- Tribe: Sophiini
- Genus: Neoeuantha; Townsend, 1931

Type species
- Dexia aucta Wiedemann 1830

Genus of flies

Neoeuantha is a genus of flies in the family Tachinidae.

== Species ==
- Neoeuantha aucta (Wiedemann, 1830)
- Neoeuantha sabroskyi Guimarães, 1982
