= Sophia (fly) =

Scientific classification
- Kingdom: Animalia
- Phylum: Arthropoda
- Class: Insecta
- Order: Diptera
- Family: Tachinidae
- Subfamily: Dexiinae
- Tribe: Sophiini
- Genus: Sophia; Robineau-Desvoidy, 1830

Type species
- Sophia filipes Robineau-Desvoidy, 1830

Genus of flies

Sophia is a genus of flies in the family Tachinidae.

== Species ==
- Sophia desvoidyi Townsend, 1931
- Sophia filipes Robineau-Desvoidy, 1830

== Distribution ==
Brazil.
