= Cryptosophia =

Scientific classification
- Kingdom: Animalia
- Phylum: Arthropoda
- Class: Insecta
- Order: Diptera
- Family: Tachinidae
- Subfamily: Dexiinae
- Tribe: Sophiini
- Genus: Cryptosophia; De Santis, 2018

Type species
- Cryptosophia aurulenta De Santis, 2018

Genus of flies

Cryptosophia is a genus of flies in the family Tachinidae.

== Species ==
- Cryptosophia aurulenta De Santis, 2018

== Distribution ==
Brazil.
