= Neosophia =

Scientific classification
- Kingdom: Animalia
- Phylum: Arthropoda
- Class: Insecta
- Order: Diptera
- Family: Tachinidae
- Subfamily: Dexiinae
- Tribe: Sophiini
- Genus: Neosophia; Guimarães, 1982

Type species
- Neosophia elongata Guimarães, 1982

Genus of flies

Neosophia is a genus of flies in the family Tachinidae.

== Species ==
- Neosophia bispinosa Santis & Nihei, 2019
- Neosophia elongata Guimarães, 1982
- Neosophia guimaraesi Santis & Nihei, 2019
