= Euantha =

Scientific classification
- Kingdom: Animalia
- Phylum: Arthropoda
- Class: Insecta
- Order: Diptera
- Family: Tachinidae
- Subfamily: Dexiinae
- Tribe: Sophiini
- Genus: Euantha; Wulp, 1891

Type species
- Dexia dives Wulp, 1885

Genus of flies

Euantha is a genus of bristle flies in the family Tachinidae.

== Species ==
- Euantha interrupta Aldrich, 1927
- Euantha litturata (Olivier, 1811)
- Euantha pulchra Wulp, 1891
