= Leptidosophia =

Scientific classification
- Kingdom: Animalia
- Phylum: Arthropoda
- Class: Insecta
- Order: Diptera
- Family: Tachinidae
- Subfamily: Dexiinae
- Tribe: Sophiini
- Genus: Leptidosophia; Townsend, 1931

Type species
- Leptidosophia lutescens Townsend, 1931

Genus of flies

Leptidosophia is a genus of flies in the family Tachinidae.

== Species ==
- Leptidosophia flava Aldrich, 1929
- Leptidosophia lutescens Townsend, 1931

== Distribution ==
Peru.
