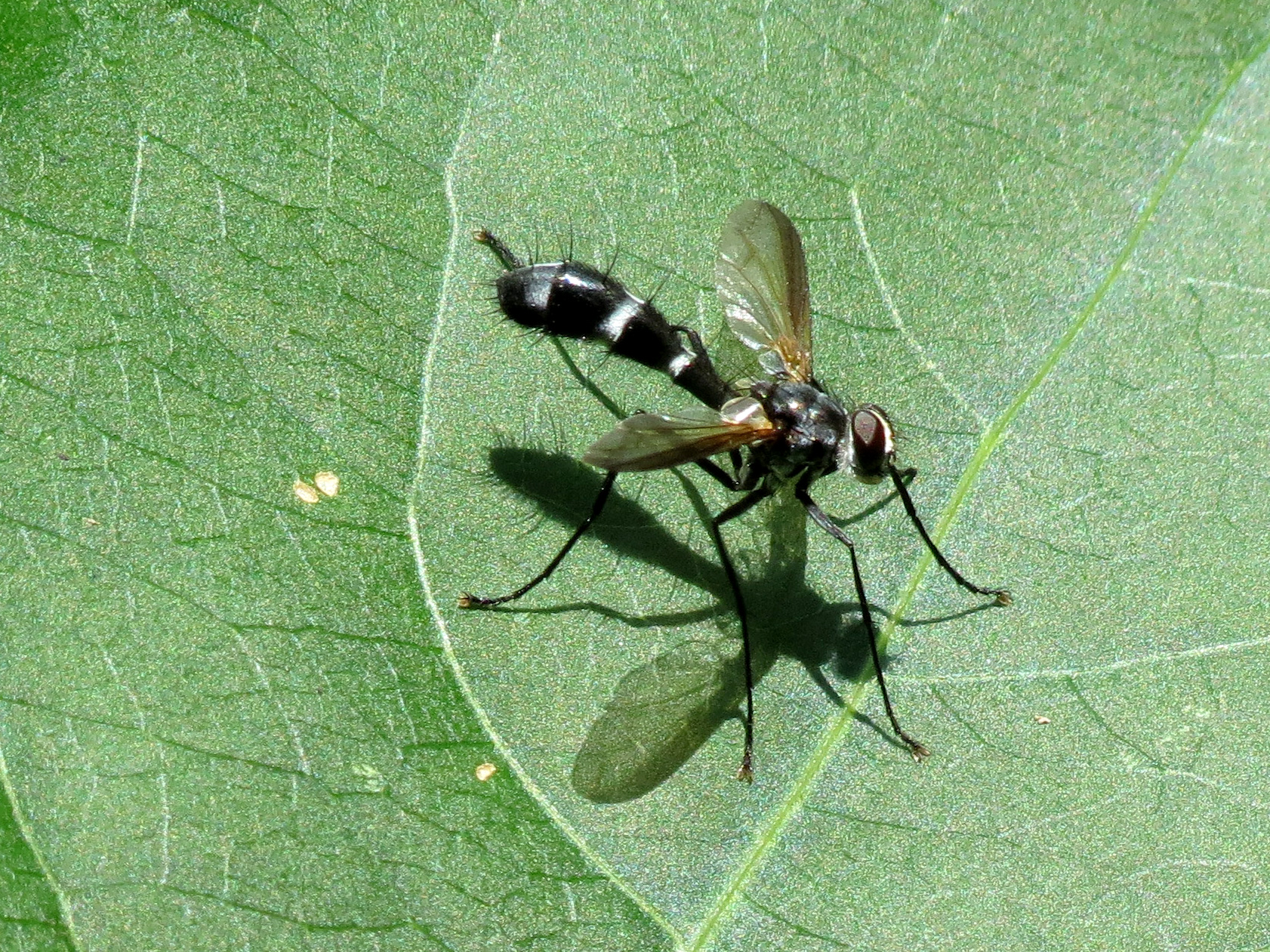
- Cordyligaster septentrionalis

Scientific classification
- Kingdom: Animalia
- Phylum: Arthropoda
- Class: Insecta
- Order: Diptera
- Family: Tachinidae
- Subfamily: Dexiinae
- Tribe: Sophiini; Townsend, 1936

= Sophiini =

Tribe of flies

Sophiini is a tribe of bristle flies in the family Tachinidae.

== Genera ==
- Cordyligaster Macquart, 1844
- Cryptosophia De Santis, 2018
- Euantha Wulp, 1885
- Euanthoides Townsend, 1931
- Leptidosophia Townsend, 1931
- Neoeuantha Townsend, 1931
- Neosophia Guimarães, 1982
- Sophia Robineau-Desvoidy, 1830
- Sophiella Guimarães, 1982
