= Paragordiidae =

Scientific classification
- Domain: Eukaryota
- Kingdom: Animalia
- Phylum: Nematomorpha
- Class: Gordioida
- Order: Chordodea
- Family: Paragordiidae

Family of horsehair worms

Paragordiidae is a family of worms belonging to the order Chordodea.

Genera:

- Digordius Kirjanova 1950
- Paragordius Camerano, 1897
