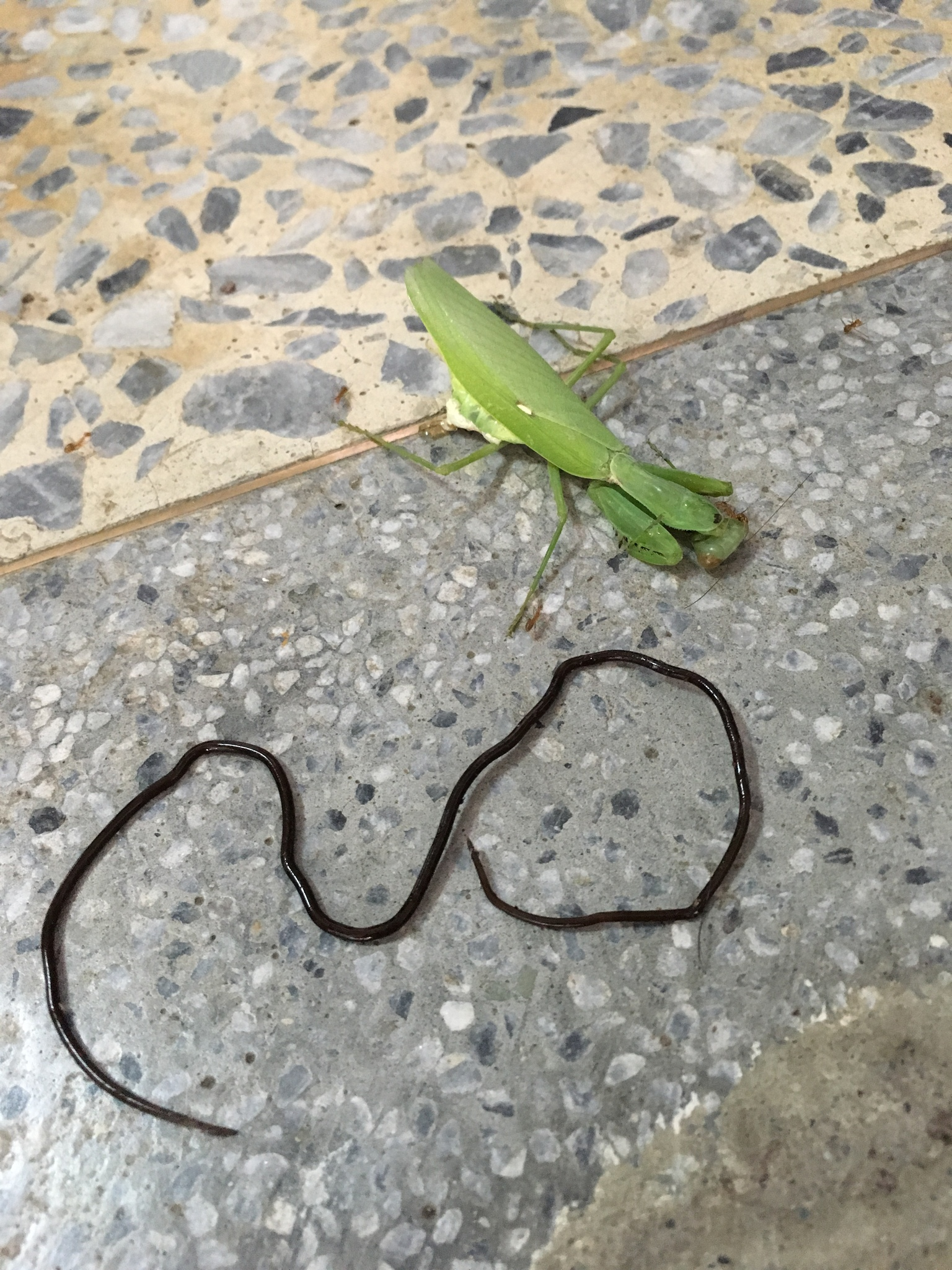
- With host

Scientific classification
- Kingdom: Animalia
- Phylum: Nematomorpha
- Class: Gordioida
- Order: Gordioidea
- Family: Chordodidae
- Genus: Chordodes
- Species: C. formosanus

Binomial name
- Chordodes formosanus Chiu, Huang, Wu, and Shiao, 2011

= Chordodes formosanus =

Species of horsehair worm

Chordodes formosanus is a horsehair worm that uses the praying mantis as its definitive host. Horsehair worms are obligate parasites that pass through different hosts at various stages. These worms can grow up to 44 centimetres (17 in) long and can be extremely dangerous for their host, especially the praying mantis.

== Morphology ==
Chordodes formosanus is morphologically similar to Chordodes japonensis. Both species have the same six cuticular structures of areoles on the surface, the significantly longer filaments on the female crowned areoles. Female horsehair appears to have a round and slightly swollen posterior end of their body, while males have a narrowed end.

== Life cycle ==
1. Chordates formosanus starts as a larva in the gut of the small insects that the mantis preys on.
2. Once the mantis ingests the infected insect, the C. formosanus starts to grow.
3. When it is mature, the worm secretes proteins that take over the host's nervous system, which directs the mantis to a body of water and causes it to jump in so that the worm can be excreted, at which point it breaks free to reproduce leaving a half empty mantis husk.

== Host specificity ==
The definitive host range of horsehair worms is limited to one or few species. Because nematomorphs are sometimes found after they have emerged from their host, definitive information on hosts is unknown in some species.

== Geographic range ==
This horsehair worm is known to be present in Japan and Taiwan.

Reproductively, they are dioecious, with the internal fertilization of eggs that are then laid in gelatinous strings. Adults have cylindrical gonads, opening into the cloaca. The larvae have rings of cuticular hooks and terminal stylets that are believed to be used to enter the hosts. Once inside the host, the larvae live inside the haemocoel and absorb nutrients directly through their skin. Development into the adult form takes weeks or months, and the larva moults several times as it grows in size.
