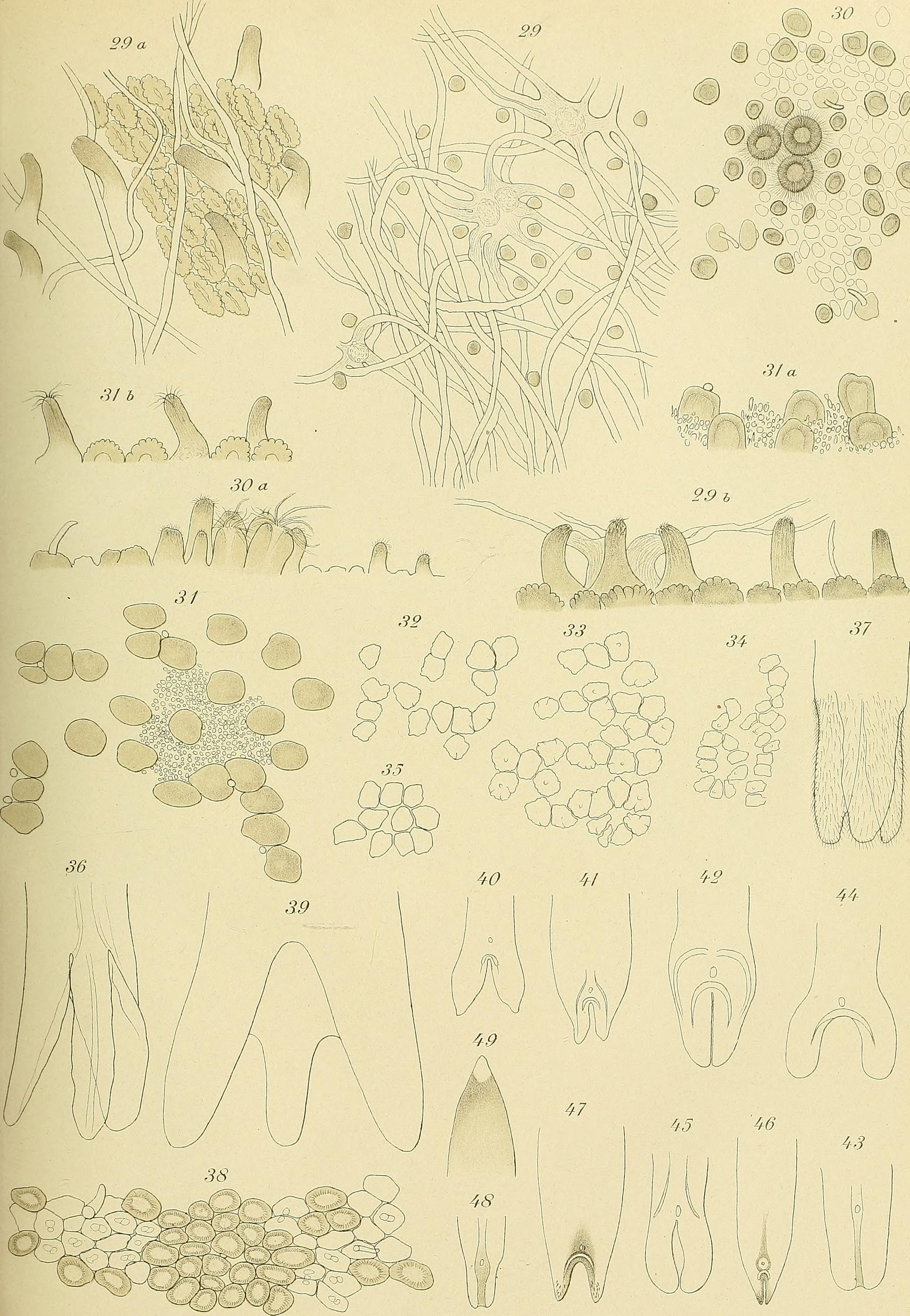

Scientific classification
- Kingdom: Animalia
- Phylum: Nematomorpha
- Class: Gordioida
- Order: Gordioidea
- Family: Chordodidae
- Genus: Paragordius
- Species: P. varius

Binomial name
- Paragordius varius (Leidy, 1851)

= Paragordius varius =

Species of horsehair worm

Paragordius varius is a parasite species in the horsehair worm group (Nematomorpha). They cycle between terrestrial and aquatic habitats and are most commonly known for their ability to manipulate their definitive host to jump into a pool of water, which allows them to complete their life cycle. Adults are over 10 cm long and 400 μm in diameter. P. varius is usually found in water or wet areas. The definitive hosts are mainly terrestrial arthropods, most often carabid beetles, crickets and praying mantids.

== Morphology ==
Paragordius varius have a slightly off-center mouth and distinct grooves running along its cylindrical body. Adult male worms grow to be 12–29 cm (4.7–11.4 in) in length, whereas females are slightly longer, up to 31 cm (12 in). This parasite is a pseudocoelomate whose body consists of an areole containing cuticle layer, monolayer hypoderm, muscular layer, ventral nerve cord and a digestive tract.

== Life cycle and reproduction ==
The life cycle of P. varius includes a terrestrial and an aquatic stage. Adult worms emerge from their insect hosts late spring or summer. They swim in the shallow waters in search for a mate. Upon encounter, the female signals to the male that she is ready and willing to mate. No penetration occurs during copulation and the male releases his sperm immediately. However, if the sperm does not land on the appropriate posterior area of the female, conception will fail. Once the sperm lands, a large circular glob forms which passes into the seminal receptacle of the female within twenty four hours of mating. Upon conception, the female P. varius lays a long, white, string of eggs and dies. Up to six million eggs are produced by a single female. Eggs are released into the water where they hatch into larvae. The larvae infect larvae of aquatic insects and snails that serve as paratenic hosts. In these they encyst after 5–14 days. As cysts they can survive the host's metamorphosis and wait for the host to be consumed by a definitive host. In the definitive host, development takes approximately 30 days. After 25 days of infection differences between males and females can be seen. Around the same time the gonads probably start to differentiate between the sexes.

== Development ==
The life cycle of nematomorphs has four stages: the first is the egg, which takes about 10–12 days to complete its larval development after being laid. Second is the pre-parasitic larva that hatches from the egg; the fully developed larva remains in the egg 7–10 days before hatching.

The hatched larvae use a paratenic host (a transport host) to transition from freshwater water to land habitats. Larvae swim freely in the water, and are ingested by insects. The free-living larvae only survive a few days. In the paratenic host, the larvae penetrate the insect's gut to enter its body cavity. In the muscular or intestinal regions the worm encysts.

Insect paratenic hosts will go through varying numbers of molts until they finally metamorphose into adult insects. The metamorphosis is not affected by the P. varius infection. The cysts themselves survive host metamorphosis and wait for the host to be consumed by a potential definitive host, either through predation or scavenging. In the definitive hosts they excyst and mature into adults.

The final stage of the nematomorphs is the free-living aquatic adult; the development only takes about thirty days where the P. varius is able to produce three generations in one year. They break through the body wall of the host and become free-living. Eventually the P. varius will leave the definitive host when the host is near water. This is done by manipulating its host to migrate to a shallow body of water.

== Host species ==
Paragordius varius infects insect species in the order orthoptera for definitive hosts, specifically Tettigoniidea and Gryllidea, such as Gryllus firmus.

Intermediate, or paratenic, hosts include snails, mosquitos, and other small aquatic insects. It does not infect mammals.

=== Host manipulation ===
Like many horsehair worms, P. varius can alter its host's behaviour. It does this at least in two distinct ways.

In the definitive cricket (Acheta domesticus) host P. varius can reduce the time spent calling of males. Male crickets call to attract females, but are likely to also attract predators. To reduce the risk of predation P. varius reduces the calling rate of its host.

Second, to complete its life cycle, P. varius can manipulate the behaviour of its definitive host to make the host more likely to enter a body of water.

== Distribution and habitat ==
Paragordius varius is present all across North and South America, from Canada in the north and Argentina in the south. As it requires water to complete its life cycle, they are generally fount near water bodies. Lakes appear more suitable than streams.

In the lab, P. varius can withstand drying and very low temperatures (−70 °C). It can be frozen at this temperature for weeks, after which it is still capable of infecting its next host. They do show reduced survival at low temperatures.
