= Chordodea =

Scientific classification
- Domain: Eukaryota
- Kingdom: Animalia
- Phylum: Nematomorpha
- Class: Gordioida
- Order: Chordodea

Order of horsehair worms

Chordodea is an order of worms belonging to the class Gordioida.

Families:

- Chordodidae
- Chordodiolinidae
- Parachordodidae
- Paragordiidae
