= Beatogordius =

Scientific classification
- Kingdom: Animalia
- Phylum: Nematomorpha
- Class: Gordioida
- Order: Gordioidea
- Family: Chordodidae
- Genus: Beatogordius; Heinze, 1934

Genus of worms

Beatogordius is a genus of worms belonging to the family Chordodidae.

The species of this genus are found in Australia.

Species:

- Beatogordius abaiconus Carvalho, 1946
- Beatogordius abbreviatus (Villot, 1874)
- Beatogordius alfredi (Camerano, 1894)
- Beatogordius australiensis Schmidt-Rhaesa & Bryant, 2004
- Beatogordius brieni Sciacchitano, 1961
- Beatogordius deshayesi (Villot, 1874)
- Beatogordius echinatus (Linstow, 1901)
- Beatogordius erythraeus (Camerano, 1915)
- Beatogordius funis De Villalobos, Schmidt-Rhaesa & Zanca, 2003
- Beatogordius inesae (Cavalieri, 1961)
- Beatogordius irregularis De Miralles, 1972
- Beatogordius latastei (Camerano, 1895)
- Beatogordius lineatus Schmidt-Rhaesa & Bryant, 2004
- Beatogordius nagalandis Yadav, Schmidt-Rhaesa & LimaTEMJEN, 2017
- Beatogordius palustre De Villalobos, Schmidt-Rhaesa & Zanca, 2003
- Beatogordius raphaelis (Camerano, 1893)
- Beatogordius regularis Heinze, 1934
- Beatogordius sankurensis Sciacchitano, 1958
- Beatogordius ugandensis Schmidt-Rhaesa & De Villalobos, 2002
- Beatogordius variabilis De Miralles, 1981
- Beatogordius wilsoni Sciacchitano, 1958
