= Pseudochordodes =

Scientific classification
- Domain: Eukaryota
- Kingdom: Animalia
- Phylum: Nematomorpha
- Class: Gordioida
- Order: Gordioidea
- Family: Chordodidae
- Genus: Pseudochordodes; Carvalho, 1942

Genus of worms

Pseudochordodes is a genus of worms belonging to the family Chordodidae.

The species of this genus are found in South America.

Species:

- Pseudochordodes bedriagae (Camerano, 1896)
- Pseudochordodes bulbareolatus Schmidt-Rhaesa & Menzel, 2005
- Pseudochordodes dugesi (Camerano, 1898)
- Pseudochordodes gordioides (Montgomery, 1898)
- Pseudochordodes guatemalensis De Miralles, De Villalobos & Rodriguez, 1997
- Pseudochordodes manteri Carvalho, 1942
- Pseudochordodes meridionalis Carvalho & Feio, 1950
- Pseudochordodes pardalis (Camerano, 1893)
- Pseudochordodes texanus Schmidt-Rhaesa, Hanelt & Reeves, 2003
