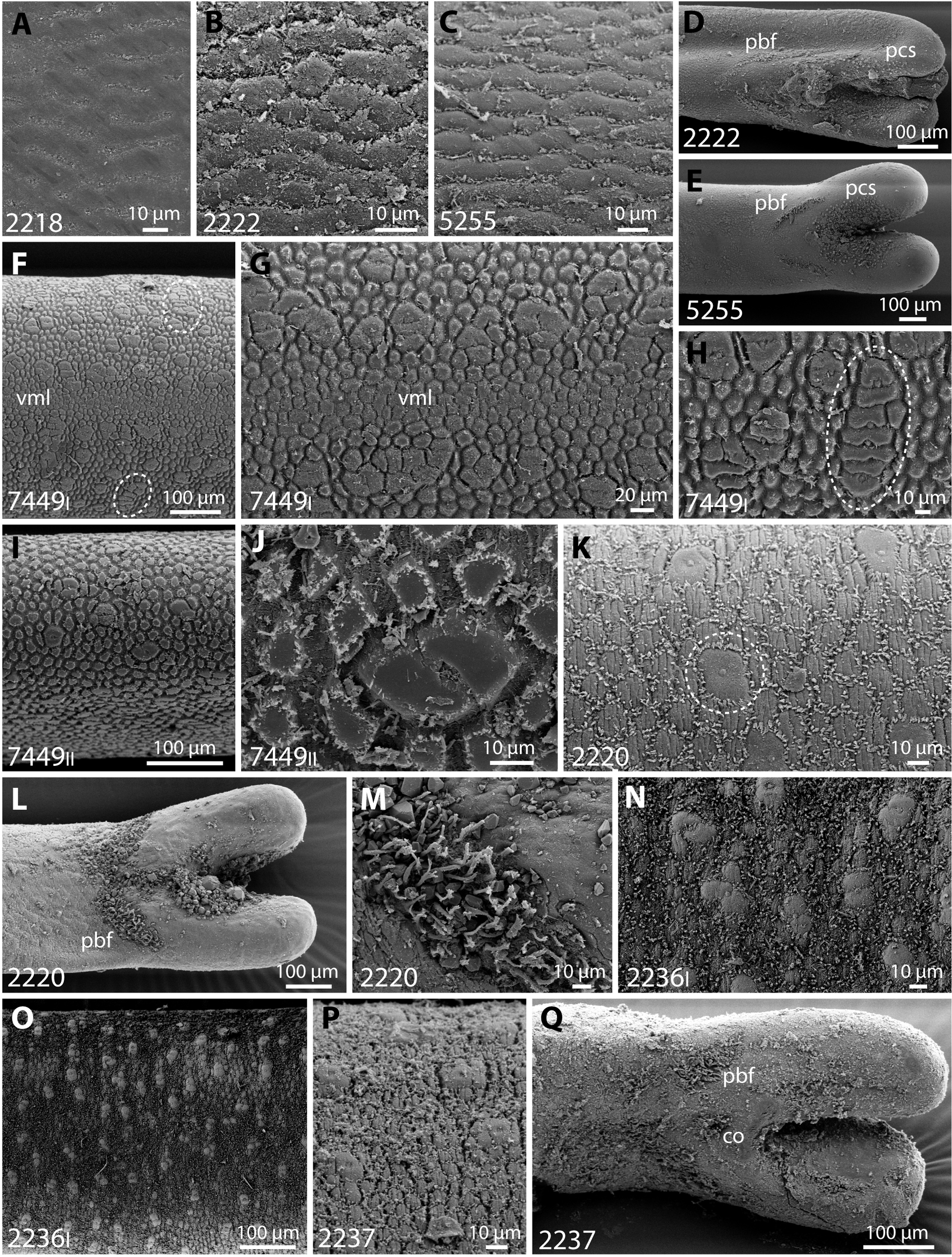
- specimens on V2218, V2222 and V5255. Posterior end with precloacal bristlefields

Scientific classification
- Domain: Eukaryota
- Kingdom: Animalia
- Phylum: Nematomorpha
- Class: Gordioida
- Order: Gordioidea
- Family: Chordodidae
- Genus: Parachordodes; Camerano, 1897

= Parachordodes =

Genus of worms

Parachordodes is a genus of worms belonging to the family Chordodidae.

The species of this genus are found in Europe and East Asia.

Several cases of human infections have been reported in South Korea, Japan.

Species:

- Parachordodes arndti Heinze, 1935
- Parachordodes capitosulcatus Montgomery, 1898
- Parachordodes ciferrii Sciacchitano, 1932
- Parachordodes lestici Heinze, 1935
- Parachordodes megareolatus Schmidt-Rhaesa, Chung & Sohn, 2003
- Parachordodes okadai Inoue, 1955
