= Elena Kalantaryan =

Armenian physician

- Born: June 16, 1890; Cherkizovo
- Died: May 30, 1963 (aged 72); Yerevan
- Education: I.M. Sechenov First Moscow State Medical University
- Occupation: helminthologist
- Known for: Skrijabini Kalantarian
- Medical career
- Field: helminthology

Elena Kalantaryan (Armenian: Ելենա Վլադիմիրի Քալանթարյան, June 16, 1890 – May 30, 1963) was an Armenian helminthologist. The founder of scientific helminthology in the Armenian SSR. Doctor of Medical Sciences (1951), Professor. Honored Scientist of the Armenian SSR (1954), Honored Doctor of the Armenian SSR.

== Life and education ==
In 1915 Kalantaryan graduated from the Moscow Medical Institute. From 1915 to 1921 she worked in Tbilissi (Georgia). 1923-1955 she was the head of the department of helminthology at the Yerevan Tropical Institute, 1944-1950 - the dean of the Yerevan Medical Institute.

Kalantaryan's research interests include the study of Pinworm, terrestrial pathology, enterobiasis, teniasis (especially Trichostrongylus, Hymenolepiasis) in the Armenian SSR. Kalantaryan was the first to describe the species of parasitic pinworms called Trichos-trongylus ax, ei (1924) and Skrijabini Kalantarian (1932) named after her. Kalantaryan proposed a new method of examining helminth eggs (1927), which is named after her.

Kalantaryan is buried at Tokhmakh Cemetery of Yerevan.

== Awards ==
- Honored Scientist of the Armenian SSR
- Honored Doctor of the Armenian SSR
- Order of Lenin
