= Bremser =

Bremser is a surname. Notable people with the surname include:

- Cindy Bremser (born 1953), American runner
- Dirk Bremser (born 1965), German football coach and former player
- Johann Gottfried Bremser (1767–1827), German-Austrian parasitologist and hygienist
- Ray Bremser (1934–1998), American poet
