= Pantachordodes =

Scientific classification
- Domain: Eukaryota
- Kingdom: Animalia
- Phylum: Nematomorpha
- Class: Gordioida
- Order: Gordioidea
- Family: Chordodidae
- Genus: Pantachordodes; Heinze, 1954

Genus of worms

Pantachordodes is a genus of worms belonging to the family Chordodidae.

Species:

- Pantachordodes europaeus (Heinze, 1952)
