= Semigordionus =

Scientific classification
- Domain: Eukaryota
- Kingdom: Animalia
- Phylum: Nematomorpha
- Class: Gordioida
- Order: Gordioidea
- Family: Chordodidae
- Genus: Semigordionus; Heinze, 1952

Genus of worms

Semigordionus is a genus of worms belonging to the family Chordodidae This genus is associated with freshwater habitats.

== Reproduction ==
This genus is Dioecious, containing both male and female reproductive organs

== Differentiation ==
This genus is differentiated from Gordionus is on the posterior end, showing a row of pre-cloacal bristles that is continuous anteriorally and not divided in two lateral rows.

Species:

- Semigordionus circumannulatus Heinze, 1952
