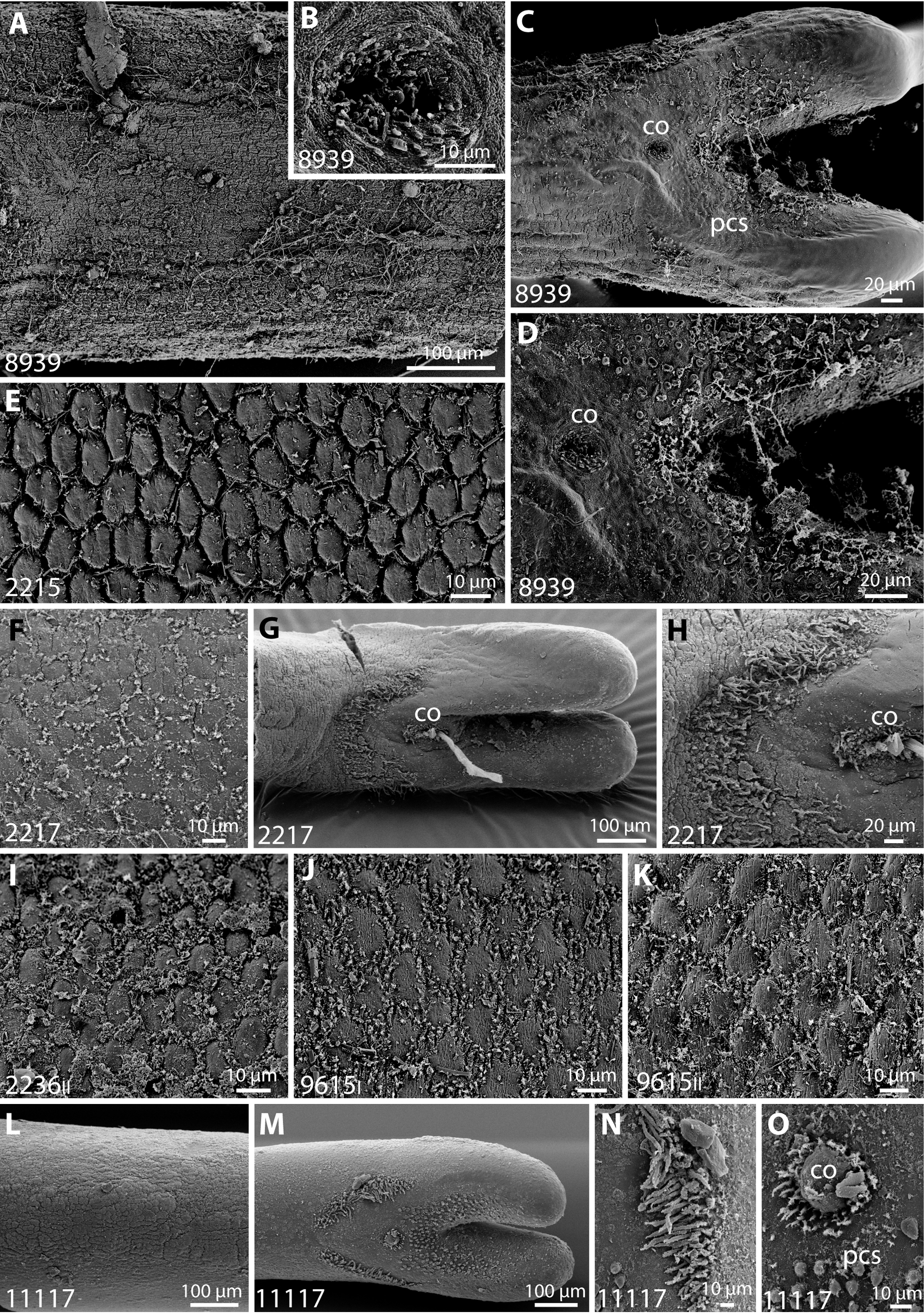

Scientific classification
- Domain: Eukaryota
- Kingdom: Animalia
- Phylum: Nematomorpha
- Class: Gordioida
- Order: Gordioidea
- Family: Chordodidae
- Genus: Gordionus; Müller, 1926

= Gordionus =

Genus of worms

Gordionus is a genus of Nematomorpha belonging to the family Chordodidae.

The species of this genus are found in Europe, Japan, Australia and Northern America.

Species:

- Gordionus alascensis (Montgomery, 1907)
- Gordionus alpestris (Villot, 1884)
