= Euchordodes =

Scientific classification
- Domain: Eukaryota
- Kingdom: Animalia
- Phylum: Nematomorpha
- Class: Gordioida
- Order: Gordioidea
- Family: Chordodidae
- Genus: Euchordodes; Heinze, 1937

Genus of worms

Euchordodes is a genus of worms belonging to the family Chordodidae.

The species of this genus are found in New Zealand.

Species:

- Euchordodes libellulovivens Heinze, 1937
- Euchordodes malayensis Inoue, 1966
- Euchordodes malaysiensis Inoue, 1966
- Euchordodes nigromaculatus Poinar, 1991
- Euchordodes parvulus Canadjija, 1956
