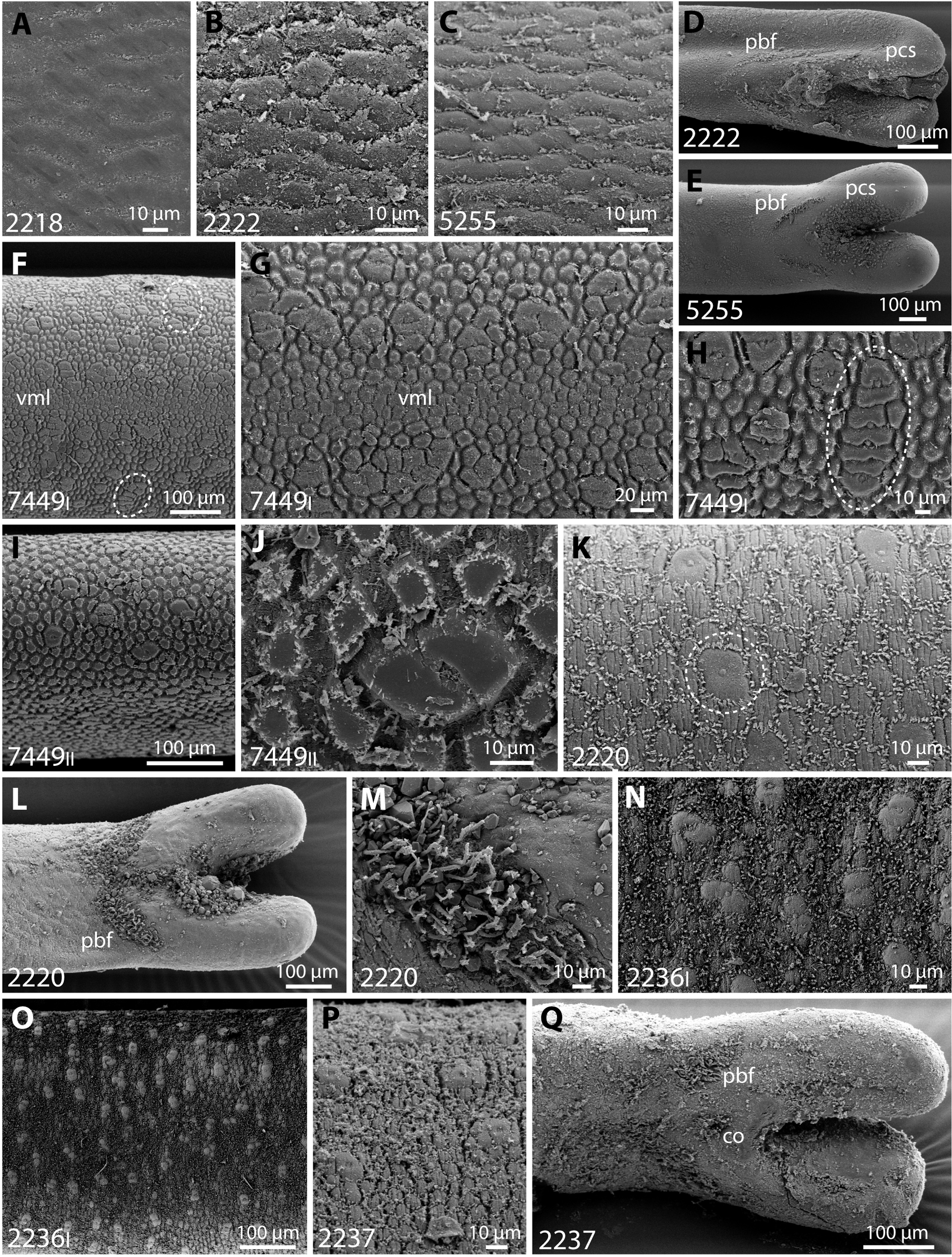
- Specimens from F–H. Represent Paragordionus

Scientific classification
- Domain: Eukaryota
- Kingdom: Animalia
- Phylum: Nematomorpha
- Class: Gordioida
- Order: Gordioidea
- Family: Chordodidae
- Genus: Paragordionus; Heinze, 1935

= Paragordionus =

Genus of worms

Paragordionus is a genus of worms belonging to the family Chordodidae.

Species:

- Paragordionus bohemicus Havlik, 1947
- Paragordionus dispar (Müller, 1926)
- Paragordionus ibericus Schmidt-Rhaesa & Cieslak, 2008
- Paragordionus kawamurai Yamaguti, 1943
