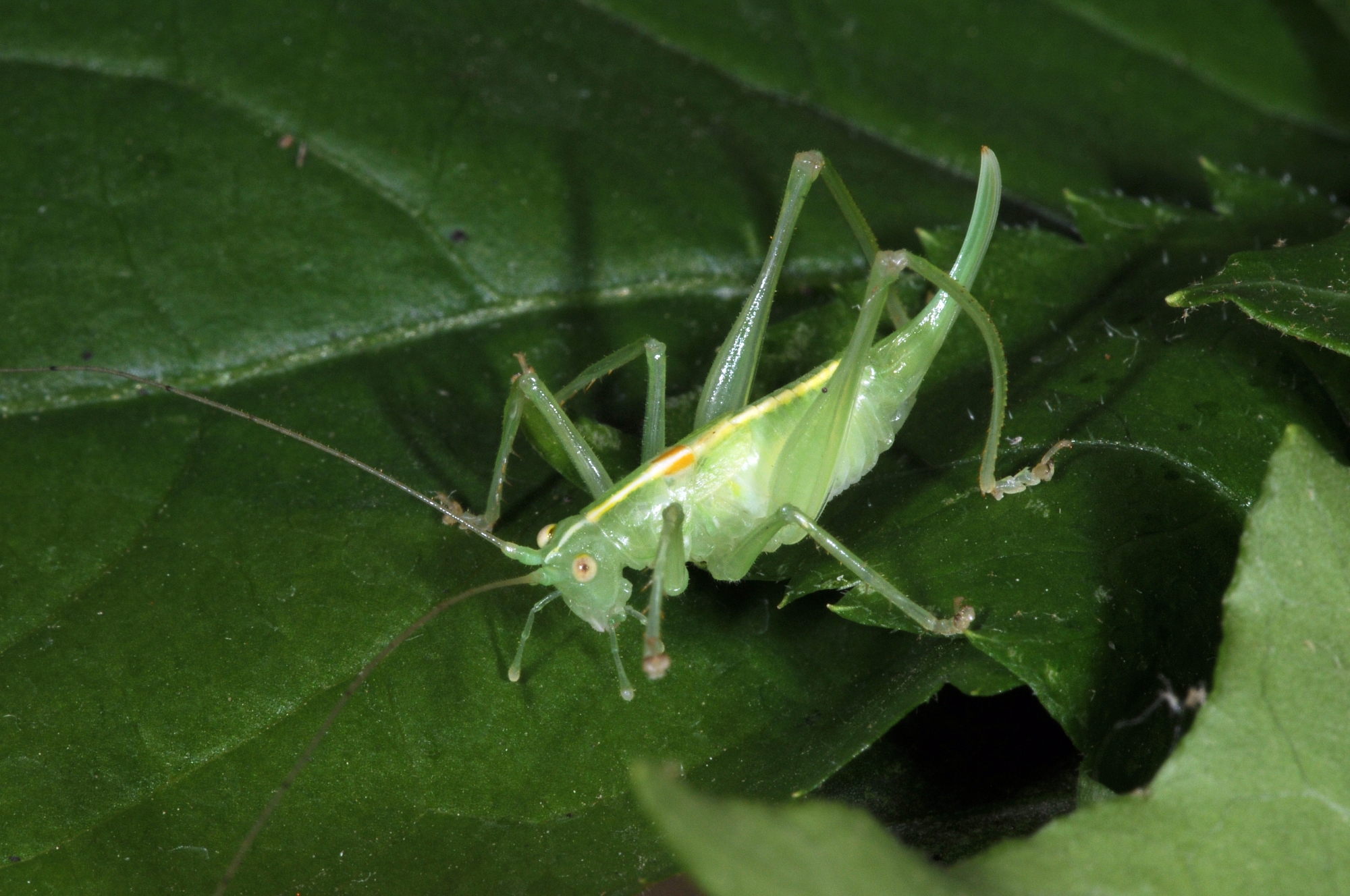

Conservation status
- Least Concern (IUCN 3.1)

Scientific classification
- Kingdom: Animalia
- Phylum: Arthropoda
- Class: Insecta
- Order: Orthoptera
- Suborder: Ensifera
- Family: Tettigoniidae
- Subfamily: Meconematinae
- Tribe: Meconematini
- Genus: Meconema
- Species: M. meridionale

Binomial name
- Meconema meridionale (Costa, 1860)

= Meconema meridionale =

Species of cricket-like animal

Sound of Meconema meridionale
Field recording in the Netherlands 34s

Meconema meridionale is an insect in the family Tettigoniidae, known as the southern oak bush cricket.

It commonly measures 14 to 17 mm in length (not including antennae) and is carnivorous, arboreal and nocturnal. It has a more southerly distribution than its relative, Meconema thalassinum, being found in southern France, southwestern Germany, Italy, Switzerland, Austria, the former Yugoslavia and, since 2001, the United Kingdom. It is a predator of the horse-chestnut leaf miner, Cameraria ohridella.

It is considered a species of least concern on the IUCN Red List as it is "widespread and common, and the population size is very large".

Close-Up of a Meconema meridionale
