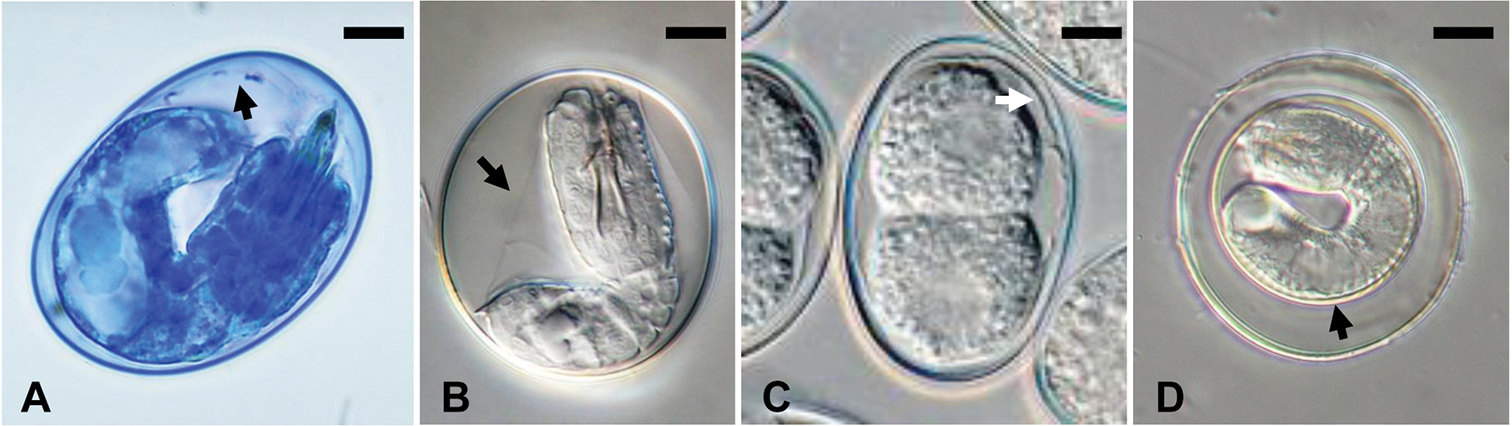
- Inner membrane at fig B surrounding an egg of Neochordodes

Scientific classification
- Domain: Eukaryota
- Kingdom: Animalia
- Phylum: Nematomorpha
- Class: Gordioida
- Order: Gordioidea
- Family: Chordodidae
- Genus: Neochordodes; Carvalho, 1942

= Neochordodes =

Genus of horsehair worms

Neochordodes is a genus of worms belonging to the family Chordodidae.

The species of this genus are found in America.

== Species ==
Species:

- Neochordodes australis De Miralles & De Villalobos, 1996
- Neochordodes bonaerensis De Miralles & De Villalobos, 1996
- Neochordodes californensis De Miralles & De Villalobos, 1995
