= Dacochordodes =

Scientific classification
- Domain: Eukaryota
- Kingdom: Animalia
- Phylum: Nematomorpha
- Class: Gordioida
- Order: Gordioidea
- Family: Chordodidae
- Genus: Dacochordodes; Capuse, 1965

Genus of worms

Dacochordodes is a genus of worms belonging to the family Chordodidae.

Species:

- Dacochordodes bacescui Capuse, 1965
