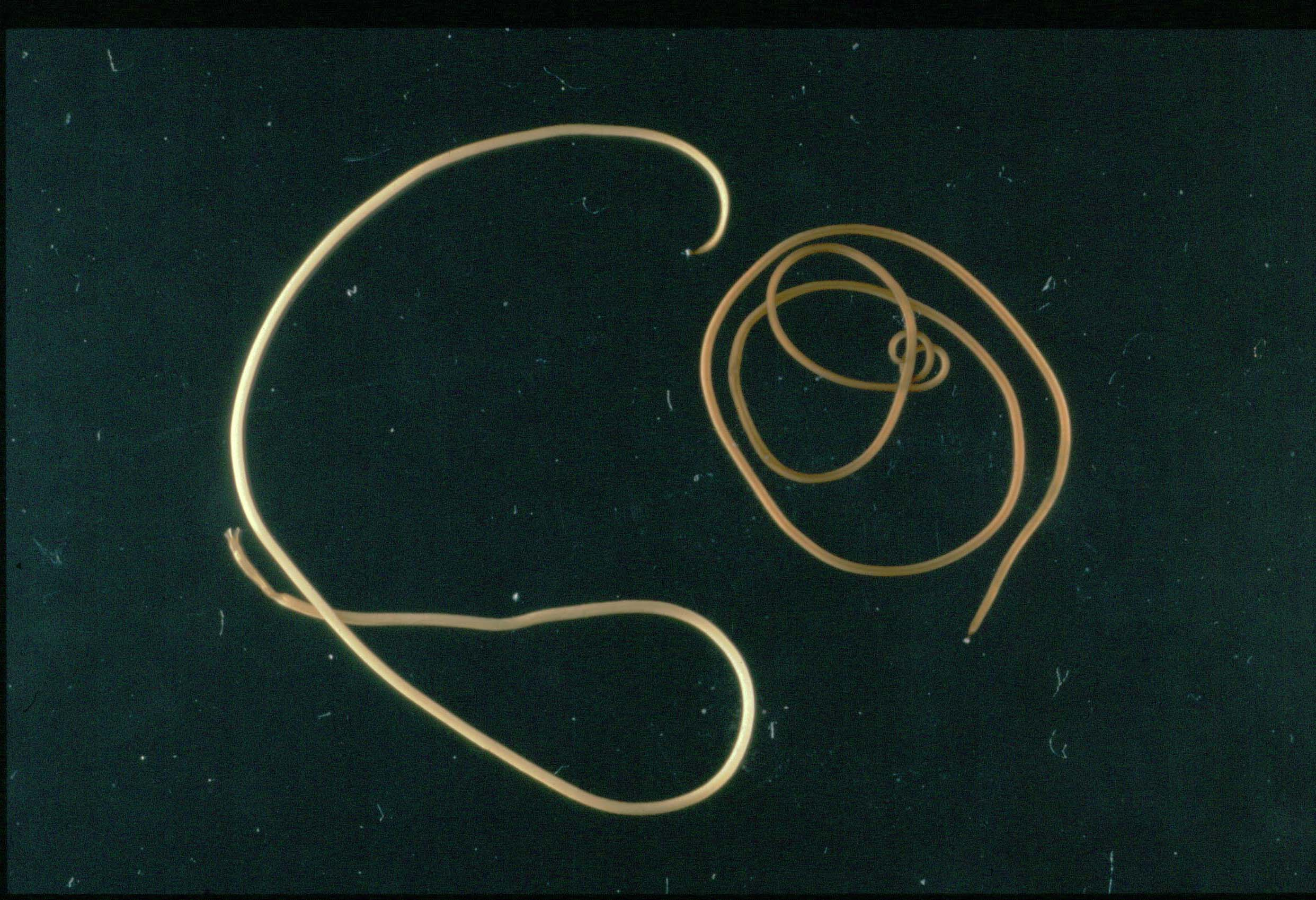

Scientific classification
- Kingdom: Animalia
- Phylum: Nematomorpha
- Class: Gordioida
- Order: Gordioidea
- Family: Chordodidae
- Genus: Paragordius
- Species: P. tricuspidatus

Binomial name
- Paragordius tricuspidatus (Dufour, 1828)

= Paragordius tricuspidatus =

Species of horsehair worm

Paragordius tricuspidatus is a species of parasitic Gordian worm that infects the cricket Nemobius sylvestris.

== Life cycle ==
In its larval stage, the worm is microscopic, but grows into a large worm (10–15 cm or 3.9–5.9 in) inside its host after accidental ingestion. Eggs are laid at the edge of the water by rivers where crickets frequently reside. Upon ingestion, the worm nourishes upon its host and fills the entire body cavity of the cricket, until maturation, when the parasitic worm is ready to exit into water to complete its life cycle.

=== Hijacking of host behavior ===
The worm induces a peculiar behavior in its cricket host which causes the cricket to leap into water whereby the parasitic worm can slither out and find its mate, while the cricket often perishes.

Studies of this parasitic worm have shown that the manipulative tactics of Paragordius tricuspidatus may be chemically based. In the related Spinochordodes tellinii, another parasitic and brain-manipulative nematomorph, the parasitic worm produces certain effector molecules to manipulate the cricket's central nervous system to behave in ways that are out of the norm for the insect, as in jumping into water. In addition, S.tellinii produces a group of proteins in the Wnt family that are similar to insect proteins, which suggests molecular mimicry as a possible source for behavioral manipulation.

=== Defense from predation ===
Should the cricket be preyed upon by a predator, such as a fish or frog, the worm has the ability to not only escape from the host's body but also the predator's digestive system. The worm emerges from the predator unharmed and proceeds to live its life normally. If a worm's host is instead attacked by a notonectid bug, which injects digestive juices into its prey and does not swallow it whole, the worm instead leaves its host earlier than normal.
