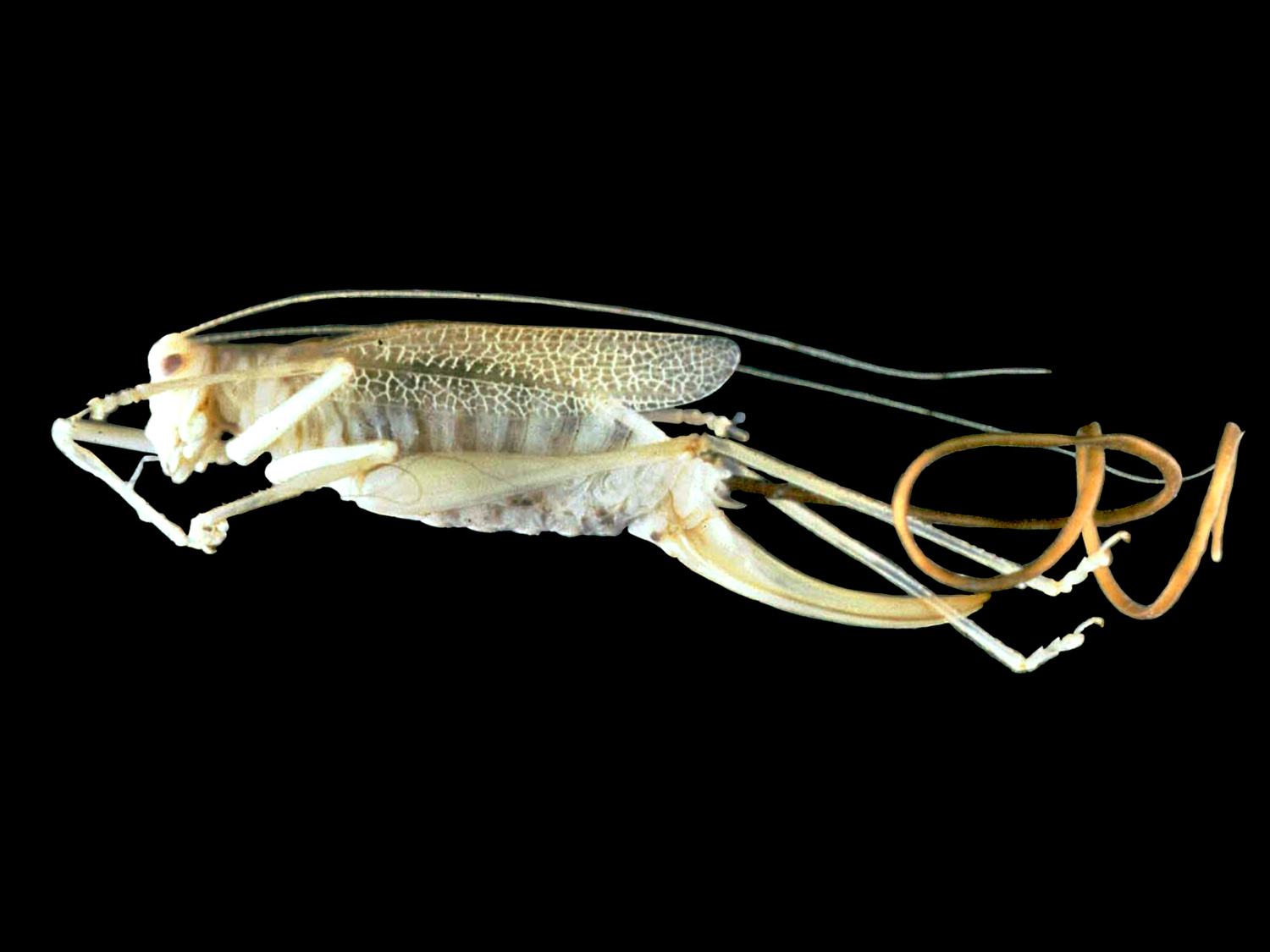
- Spinochordodes tellinii with its bush-cricket host (Meconema thalassinum)

Scientific classification
- Kingdom: Animalia
- Phylum: Nematomorpha
- Class: Gordioida
- Order: Gordioidea
- Family: Chordodidae
- Subfamily: Chordodinae
- Genus: Spinochordodes
- Species: S. tellinii

Binomial name
- Spinochordodes tellinii (Camerano, 1888)

= Spinochordodes tellinii =

Species of horsehair worm

Spinochordodes tellinii is a parasitic nematomorph hairworm whose larvae develop in grasshoppers and crickets. This parasite is able to influence its host's behavior: once the parasite is grown, it causes its grasshopper host to jump into water, where the grasshopper will likely drown. The parasite then leaves its host; the adult worm lives and reproduces in water. S. tellinii does not influence its host to actively seek water over large distances, but only when it is already close to water.

The microscopic larvae are ingested by their insect hosts and develop inside them into worms that can be three to four times longer than the host.

The precise molecular mechanism underlying the modification of the host's behaviour is not yet known. A study in 2005 indicated that grasshoppers which contain the parasite express, or create, different proteins in their brains compared to uninfected grasshoppers. Some of these proteins have been linked to neurotransmitter activity, others to geotactic activity, or the body's response to changes in gravity. Furthermore, it appears that the parasite produces proteins from the Wnt family that act directly on the development of the central nervous system and are similar to proteins known from other insects, suggesting an instance of molecular mimicry.

A similar parasitic worm is Paragordius tricuspidatus.
