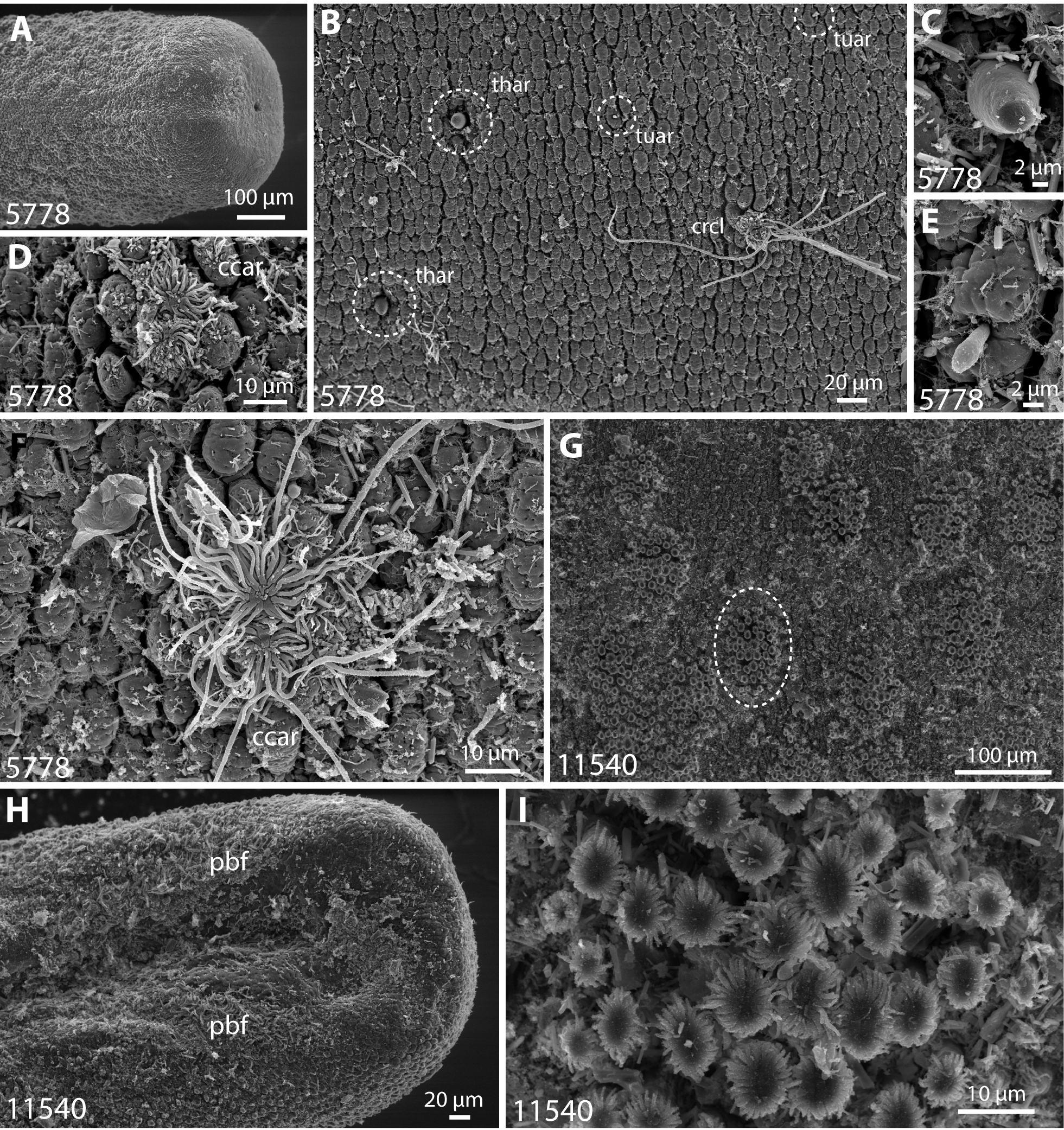

Scientific classification
- Kingdom: Animalia
- Phylum: Nematomorpha
- Class: Gordioida
- Order: Gordioidea
- Family: Chordodidae
- Subfamily: Chordodinae
- Genus: Chordodes; Creplin, 1847

= Chordodes =

Genus of horsehair worms

Chordodes is a genus of worms belonging to the family Chordodidae.

The species of this genus are found in Northern America, Africa, Malesia and Australia.

== Species ==
Species:

- Chordodes aelianus (Camerano, 1894)
- Chordodes aethiopicus Inoue, 1974
- Chordodes formosanus Chiu, Huang, Wu & Shiao, 2011
