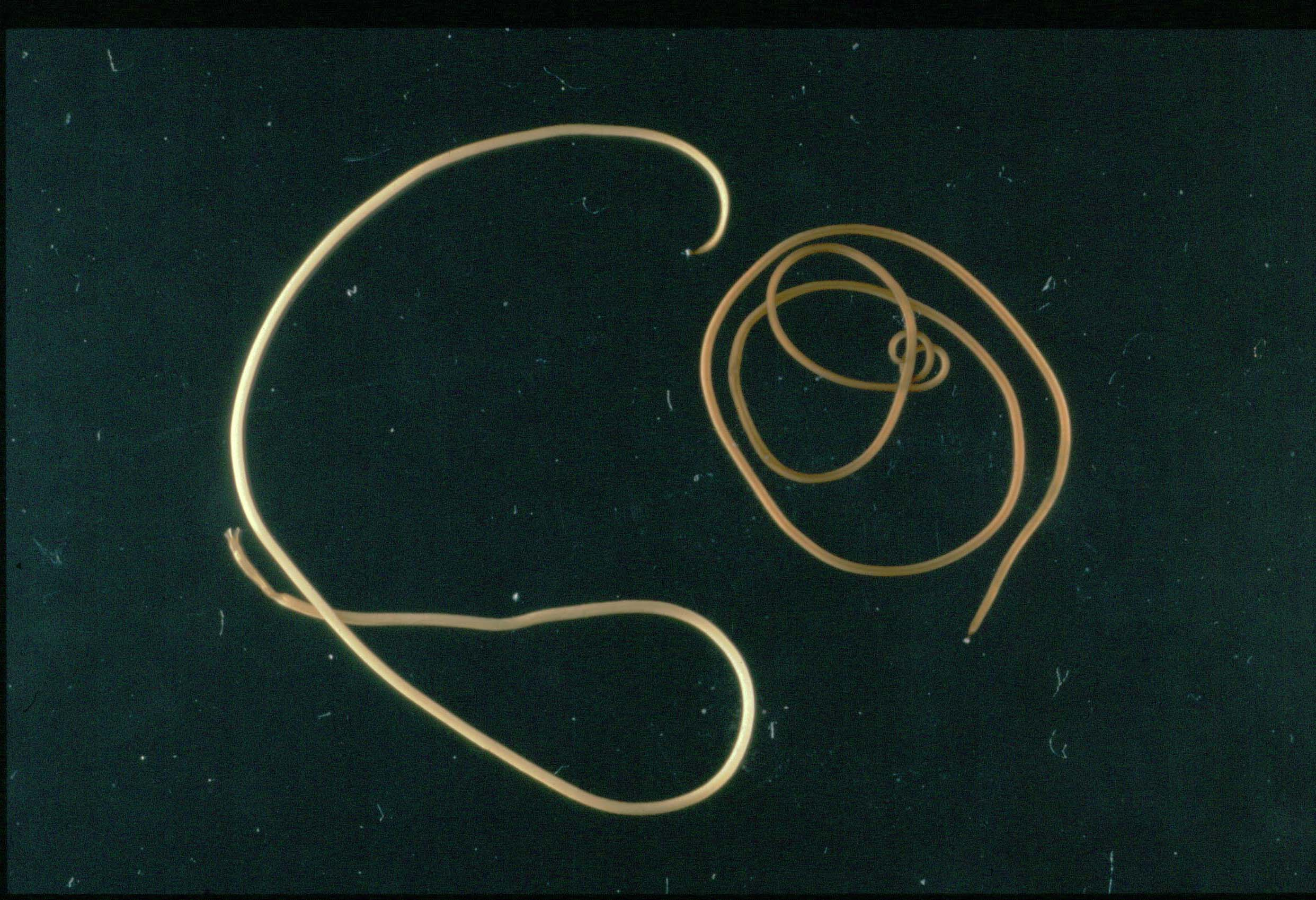
- Paragordius tricuspidatus

Scientific classification
- Domain: Eukaryota
- Kingdom: Animalia
- Phylum: Nematomorpha
- Class: Gordioida
- Order: Gordioidea
- Family: Chordodidae
- Genus: Paragordius; Camerano, 1897

= Paragordius =

Genus of worms

Paragordius is a genus of worms belonging to the family Chordodidae. It was independently described by both Lorenzo Camerano in 1897 and Thomas Harrison Montgomery Jr. in 1898, though both authors gave the genus the same name.

The genus has almost cosmopolitan distribution, although most species are known from the Afrotropic and Neotropic regions. Females of the genus are notable for having three posterior lobes, while males have long tail lobes, allowing Paragordius species to be readily identified.

Species:

- Paragordius amicus Swanteson-Franz, Marquez, Goldstein, Schmidt-Rhaesa, Bolek & Hanelt, 2018
- Paragordius andreasii Zanca & De Villalobos, 2006
- Paragordius areolatus Linstow, 1906
- Paragordius cinctus Linstow, 1906
- Paragordius dartevallei Sciacchitano, 1958
- Paragordius diversolobatus Heinze, 1935
- Paragordius emeryi (Camerano, 1895)
- Paragordius esavianus Carvalho, 1942
- Paragordius flavescens Linstow, 1906
- Paragordius laurae Sciacchitano, 1958
- Paragordius marlieri Sciacchitano, 1958
- Paragordius minusculus Carvalho, 1944
- Paragordius mulungensis Sciacchitano, 1958
- Paragordius obamai Hanelt, 2012
- Paragordius somaliensis Sciacchitano, 1962
- Paragordius stylosus (Linstow, 1883)
- Paragordius tanganikensis Sciacchitano, 1958
- Paragordius tricuspidatus (Dufour, 1828)
- Paragordius varius (Leidy, 1851)
