= Nectonema =

Scientific classification
- Kingdom: Animalia
- Superphylum: Ecdysozoa
- Clade: Nematoida
- Phylum: Nematomorpha
- Class: Nectonematoida
- Order: Nectonematoidea; Rauther, 1930
- Family: Nectonematidae; Ward, 1892
- Genus: Nectonema; Verrill, 1879

Species
- N. agile N. melanocephalum N. munidae N. svensksundi N. zealandica

Genus of roundworms

Nectonema is a genus of marine horsehair worms first described by Addison E. Verrill in 1879. It is the only genus in the family Nectonematidae described by Henry B. Ward in 1892, in the order Nectonematoidea, and in the class Nectonematoida. The genus contains five species; all species have a parasitic larval stage inhabiting crustacean hosts and a free-living adult stage that swims in open water.

== Taxonomy ==
Nectonematoidea is one of two orders within the phylum Nematomorpha, the other being Gordioidea. The latter is likewise in a single class Gordioida, which is a significantly larger taxon, with over 300 known species. Nematomorpha are known as horsehair worms or Gordian worms, and form a sister-group to the nematodes. The following classification shows the place of Nectonematoida within the protostomes according to Minelli (2008) and Tedersoo (2017):

- - Protostomia
    - Platyzoa
    - Spiralia
    - Ecdysozoa
      - Introverta
        - Scalidophora
        - Nematoida
          - Nematoda
          - Nematomorpha
            - Gordioidea
            - Nectonematoidea
      - Panarthropoda
      - Chaetognatha

Within Nectonematoida only a single genus, Nectonema, is known, with five species so far described:

- Nectonema agile (Verrill, 1879)
- Nectonema melanocephalum (Nierstrasz, 1907)
- Nectonema munidae (Brinkmann, 1930)
- Nectonema svensksundi (Bock, 1913)
- Nectonema zealandica (Poinar & Brockerhoff, 2001)

Three species are known from the North Atlantic, including N. agile from the North American and European coasts, as well as in the Mediterranean Sea and Black Sea. N. munidae has been recorded in fjords near Bergen, Norway in the North Sea, and N. svensksundi is known from Svalbard. Additional unconfirmed reports of possible Nectonema specimens have come from Western Greenland, Brazil and Sierra Leone. In the Pacific Ocean, N. melanocephalum was recorded off the Balabalagan Islands in the Makassar Strait of Indonesia, while N. zealandica has been recorded off the coast of New Zealand. There are also reports of Nectonema from Japan.

== Description ==
Nectonema has not been extensively studied, and most of what is known about the genus is based on the two best-studied species, N. agile and N. munidae. There are several unique features that distinguish marine nematomorphs (nectonematids) from freshwater nematomorph species (gordiids). Studies indicate differences in muscle cell structure as well as an anterior body cavity. While gordiids possess a single longitudinal ventral nerve cord, nectonematids possess an additional dorsal nerve cord. Nectonematids also possess a blindly-ending intestine and double rows of dorsal and ventral cuticular natatory bristles. In males, sperm sacs attached to the dorsal epidermis are the gonads, while females possess a vesicle-rich tissue called a gono-parenchyne during early developmental stages. Additionally, spines are formed on nectonematid eggs after they make contact with seawater.

Like all horsehair worms, there is a lack of excretory organs or blood. The digestive system does not primarily fulfil the role of nutrient uptake, which instead likely occurs through the cuticle, but rather the storage of substances that are taken up through the cuticle. Layers of cuticle have been observed, with an adult cuticle forming underneath the larval cuticle, in addition to a cellular epidermis. The nervous system consists of a circumesophageal nerve ring that functions as a simple brain along with two longitudinal nerve cords located dorsally and ventrally, though the dorsal part of the nerve ring reduces as individuals mature. The sensory system is either largely absent or poorly understood. Bristles and probable cilium have been observed on the cuticle, which appear to be connected to the nervous system in a sensory role. Additionally, giant cells with a diameter up to 400 μm have been observed in the anterior cavity of three species (N. agile, N. munidae and N. zealandica) which have been posited to play a role in sensory perception by Ward (1892) and Bresciani (1991). The cells appear to be connected to the nerve chord via axons, supporting this interpretation. However, their potential sensory role remains unclear.

Species exhibit sexual dimorphism in their size, with males growing to lengths from 10 mm (0.39 in) to 270 mm (11 in) depending on species, while females of all species are longer than males, growing to between 34 mm (1.3 in) and 960 mm (38 in) in length. Larval nectonematids have only been described once, with the smallest being 350 μm in length and possessing rings of spines as well as cuticular structures denoted "jaws" on the anterior.

== Ecology and life cycle ==
Nectonematids spend the larval stage of their life cycle as parasites of decapod crustaceans. At least 28 host species have been identified, including hermit crabs, crabs, caridean shrimp and Eusergestes prawns; a single N. agile individual has also been found within an American lobster (Homarus americanus) specimen. Larvae inhabit hosts' body cavity, especially in the region of the thorax; typically, a decapod will be host to a single nectonematid, however as many as nine have been observed inhabiting a single crab. Evidence is conflicting on possible correlations between the size and sex of hosts and nectonematid infection rates and growth sizes. Conflicting observations also exist on whether the parasites cause internal damage to their hosts, with Mouchet (1931) and Leslie et al. (1981) reporting damage to male reproductive organs in host species Pagurus bernhardus, Anapagurus hyndmanni and Cancer irroratus, while Brinkmann (1930), Nouvel & Nouvel (1934) and Nielsen (1969) did not observe any tissue alteration.

After emerging from their hosts, adult nematomorphs use their dorsal and ventral double rows of bristles to swim through open water. In preparation for reproduction, mature females' body cavities become filled with eggs, while males form sperm sacs. Unlike gordiids, nectonematids copulate, with males inserting their posterior end into the genital opening of the female.
