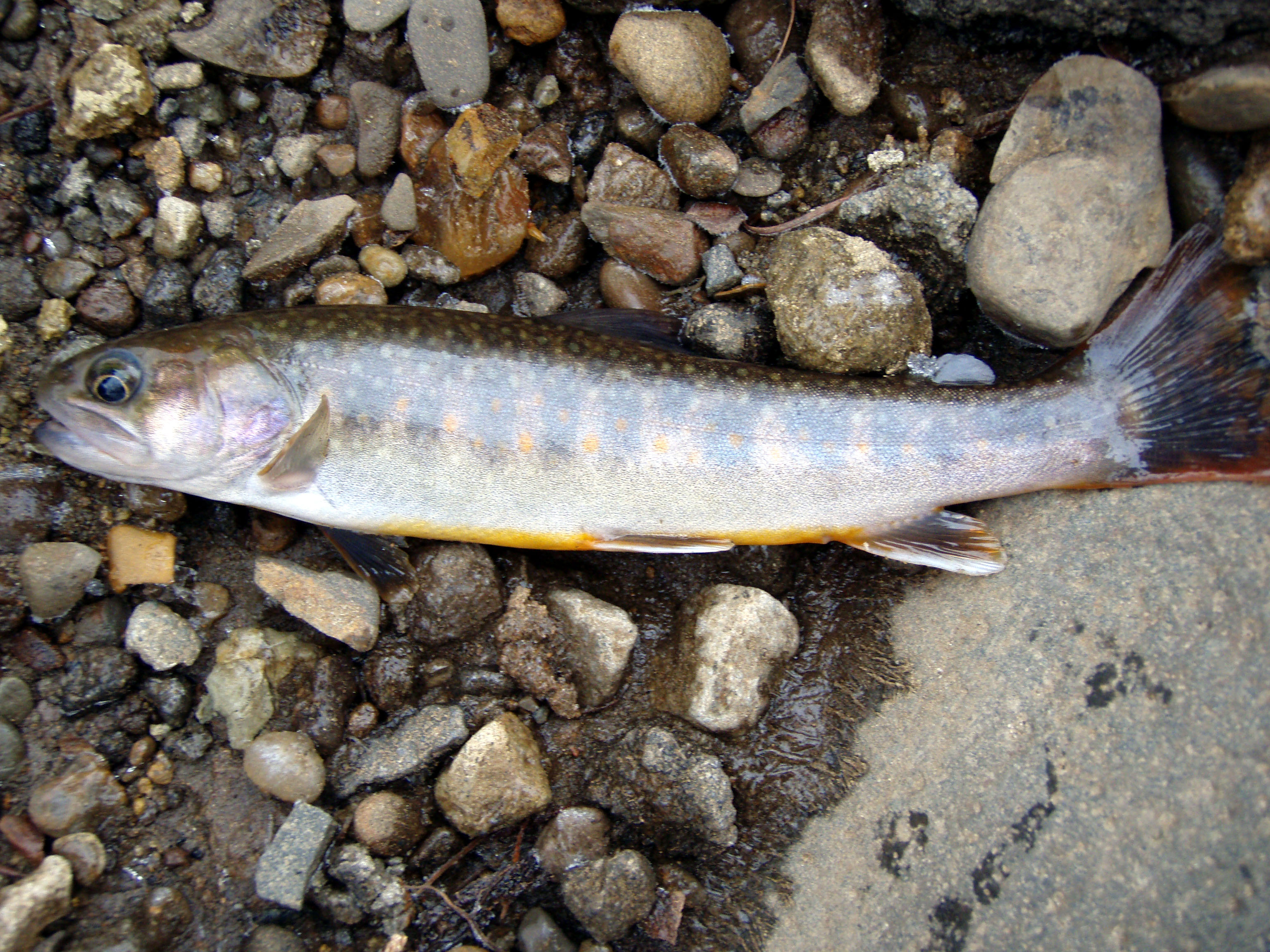

Conservation status
- Endangered (IUCN 2.3)

Scientific classification
- Kingdom: Animalia
- Phylum: Chordata
- Class: Actinopterygii
- Order: Salmoniformes
- Family: Salmonidae
- Genus: Salvelinus
- Species: S. leucomaenis
- Subspecies: S. l. japonicus

Trinomial name
- Salvelinus leucomaenis japonicus Ōshima, 1961

Synonyms
- Salvelinus japonicus

= Kirikuchi char =

Subspecies of fish

The Kirikuchi char (Salvelinus leucomaenis japonicus) is a freshwater fish in the family Salmonidae. It is endemic to the Kii Peninsula of central Honshu in Japan. It is the southernmost population of the char genus Salvelinus and is considered a relict in its region. It is usually considered a subspecies of the whitespotted char Salvelinus leucomaenis but was listed as a separate species in the IUCN Red List (1996).

Other subspecies of the whitespotted char S. leucomaenis have, however, been introduced in the area of the kirikuchi char, which has led to extensive hybridization. Kirikuchi char remain in two separate headwater streams of the Totsu River system, and they retain little genetic variation.

The Kirikuchi Char is endangered due to human disturbances, including degradation and overharvesting. Additionally, the species continues to become more endangered due to the loss of genetic diversity from hybridization.

Up to 60% of the diet of Kirikuchi char is made up of orthopterans driven into the water by nematomorph parasites. The chars' growth rates are highest in autumn, when nematomorphs influence the behaviour of their hosts to drown themselves.
