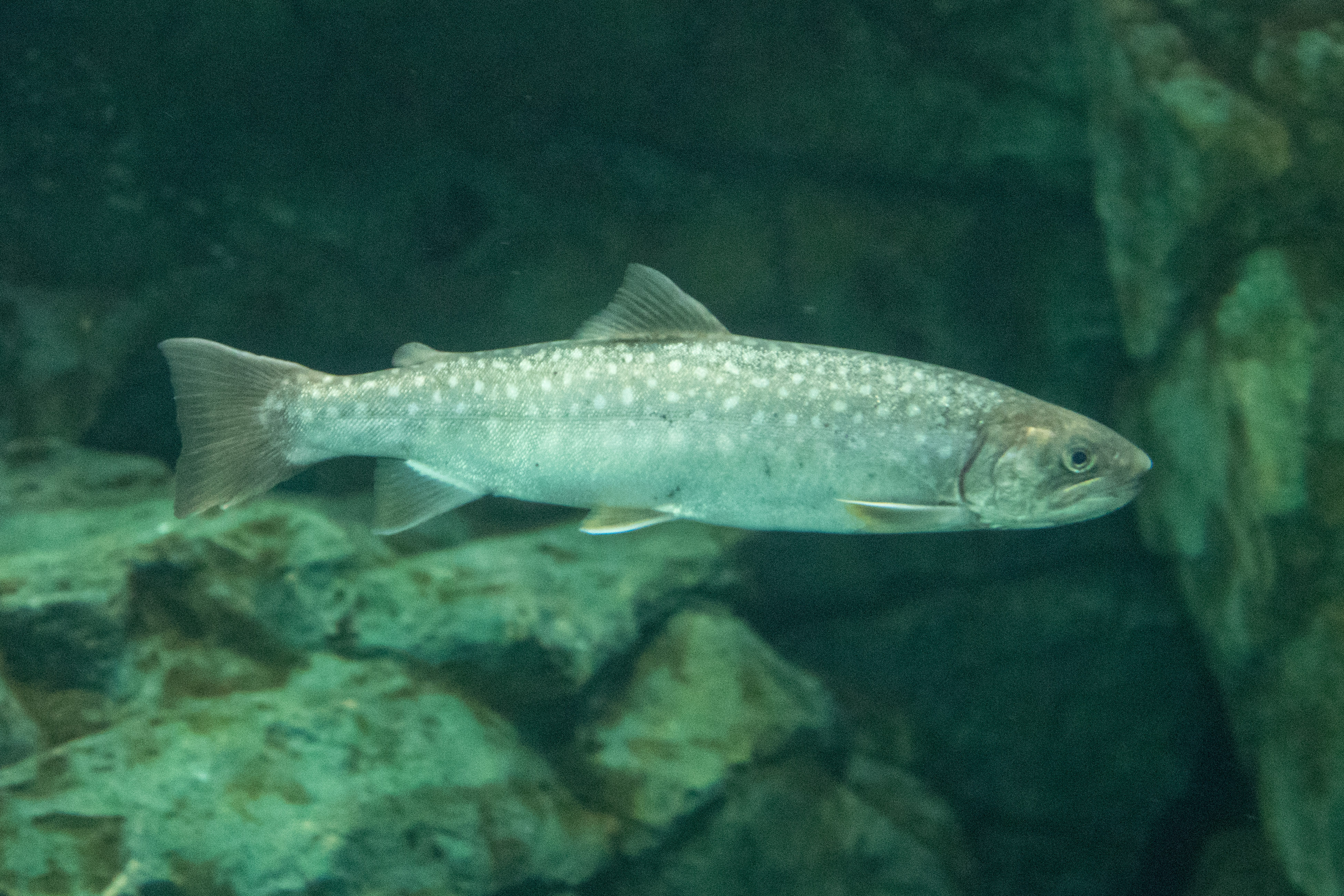

Conservation status
- Least Concern (IUCN 3.1)

Scientific classification
- Kingdom: Animalia
- Phylum: Chordata
- Class: Actinopterygii
- Division: Teleostei
- Order: Salmoniformes
- Family: Salmonidae
- Genus: Salvelinus
- Species: S. leucomaenis

Binomial name
- Salvelinus leucomaenis (Pallas, 1814)

Subspecies
- S. l. leucomaenis (Pallas, 1814); S. l. imbrius D. S. Jordan & E. A. McGregor, 1925; S. l. pluvius (Hilgendorf, 1876); S. l. japonicus Ōshima, 1961

= Salvelinus leucomaenis =

Species of fish

Salvelinus leucomaenis, the whitespotted char, is an East Asian trout in the genus Salvelinus, called iwana in Japanese and kundzha (кунджа) in Russian. Both landlocked and ocean-run forms occur. The landlocked form typically grows up to 35 cm (1 ft 2 in), and prefers low-temperature streams. The seagoing fish typically grows to 70 cm (28 in) long. The largest reported specimen was 120 cm (3 ft 11 in) long and the oldest was nine years old.

Iwana is widely fished in Japan. Apart from Hokkaido and mountain streams in the Japanese Alps, the species is found in northeast Korea and in Russia in Sakhalin, Kuril Islands and Kamchatka.

The kirikuchi char (Salvelinus leucomaenis japonicus or Salvelinus japonicus) is usually considered a subspecies of S. leucomaenis. Two other subspecies are also listed, S. l. imbrius and S. l. pluvius.
