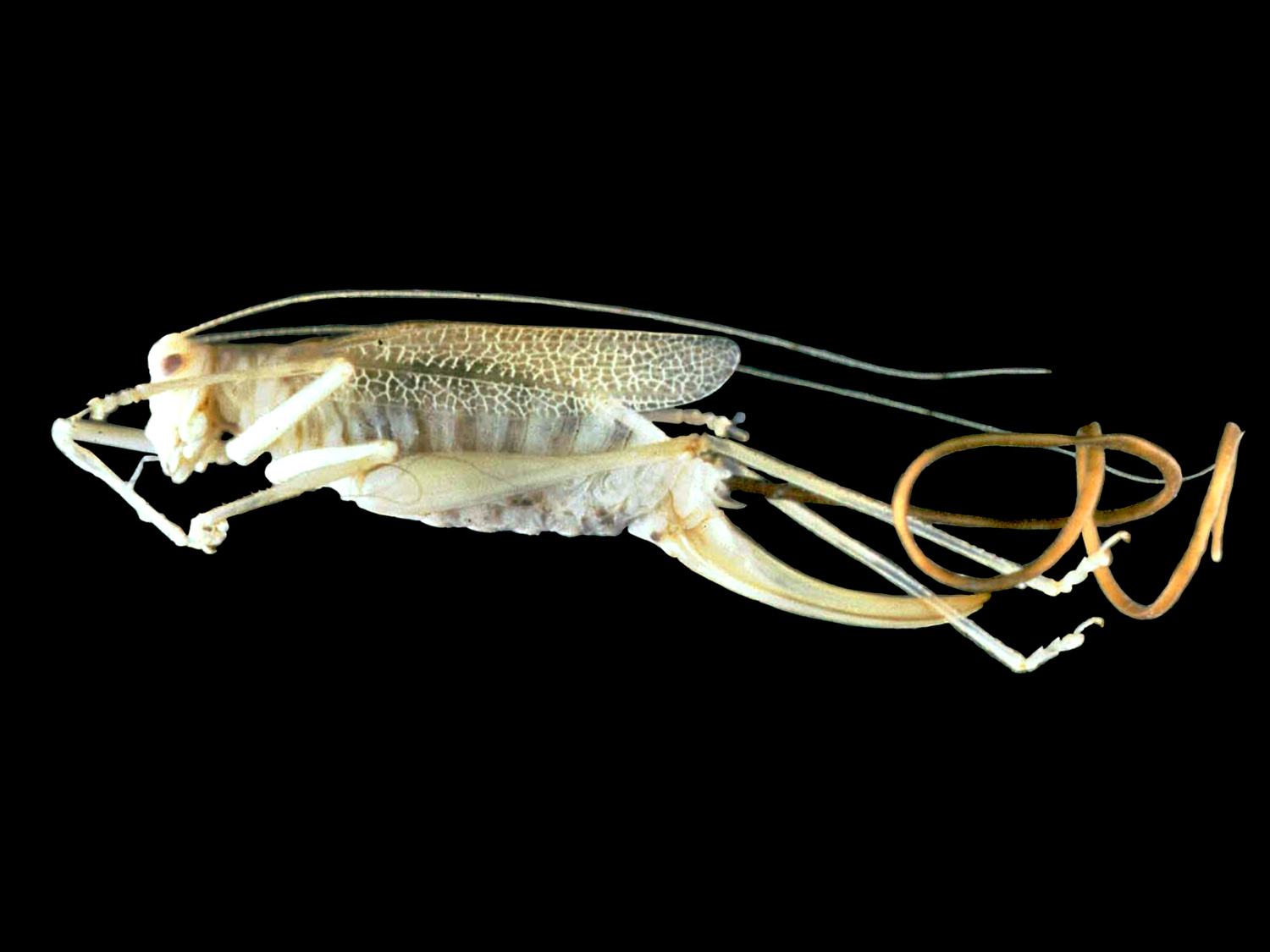
- Spinochordodes in Meconema

Scientific classification
- Domain: Eukaryota
- Kingdom: Animalia
- Phylum: Nematomorpha
- Class: Gordioida
- Order: Gordioidea
- Family: Chordodidae
- Subfamily: Chordodinae
- Genus: Spinochordodes; Kirjanova, 1950

= Spinochordodes =

Genus of worms

Spinochordodes is a genus of worms belonging to the family Chordodidae.

The species of this genus are found in Europe.

Species:

- Spinochordodes actiniphorus Kirjanova, 1950
- Spinochordodes bacescui (Capuse, 1965)
- Spinochordodes baeri (Camerano, 1896)
- Spinochordodes cameranoi Kirjanova, 1950
- Spinochordodes europaeus (Heinze, 1952)
- Spinochordodes piliferus Kirjanova, 1950
- Spinochordodes skrjabini Kirjanova, 1958
- Spinochordodes tellinii (Camerano, 1888)
- Spinochordodes vitiferus Kirjanova, 1950
