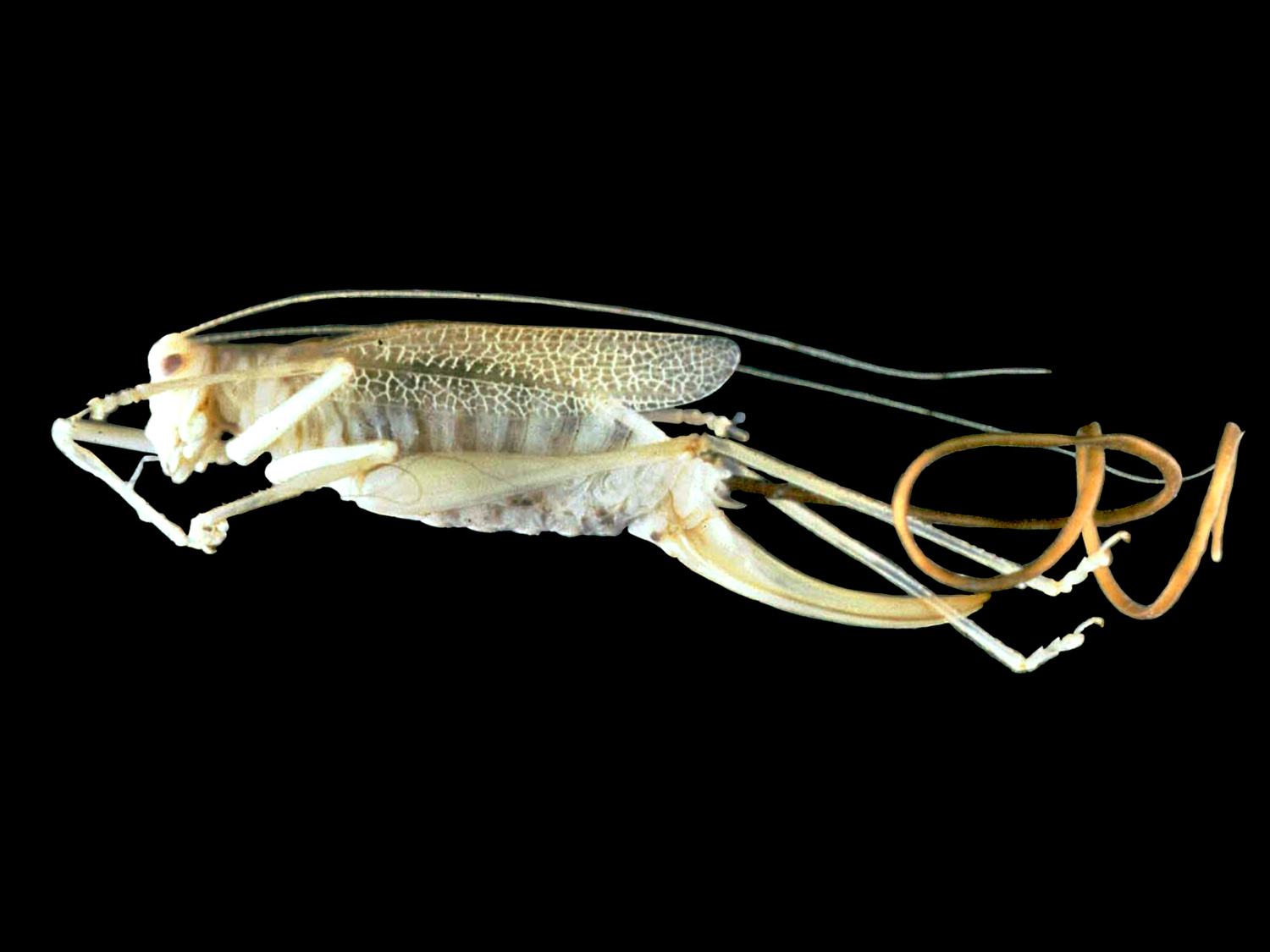
- Spinochordodes tellinii and its Meconema host

Scientific classification
- Domain: Eukaryota
- Kingdom: Animalia
- Phylum: Nematomorpha
- Class: Gordioida
- Order: Gordioidea
- Family: Chordodidae; May, 1919

Synonyms
- Chordodiolinidae; Parachordodidae

= Chordodidae =

Family of horsehair worms

Chordodidae is a family of parasitic horsehair worms belonging to the order Gordioidea; its taxonomy is under review.

== Genera ==
Two subfamilies are currently recognised; unless referenced otherwise, the Global Biodiversity Information Facility includes the following genera:

=== Chordodinae ===
Auth. Heinze, 1935

1. Chordodes Creplin, 1847
2. Dacochordodes Capuse, 1965
3. Euchordodes Heinze, 1937
4. Lanochordodes Kirjanova, 1950
5. Neochordodes Carvalho, 1942
6. Noteochordodes Miralles and Villalobos, 2000
7. Pantachordodes Heinze, 1954
8. Pseudochordodes Carvalho, 1942
9. Spinochordodes Kirjanova, 1950

=== Paragordiinae ===
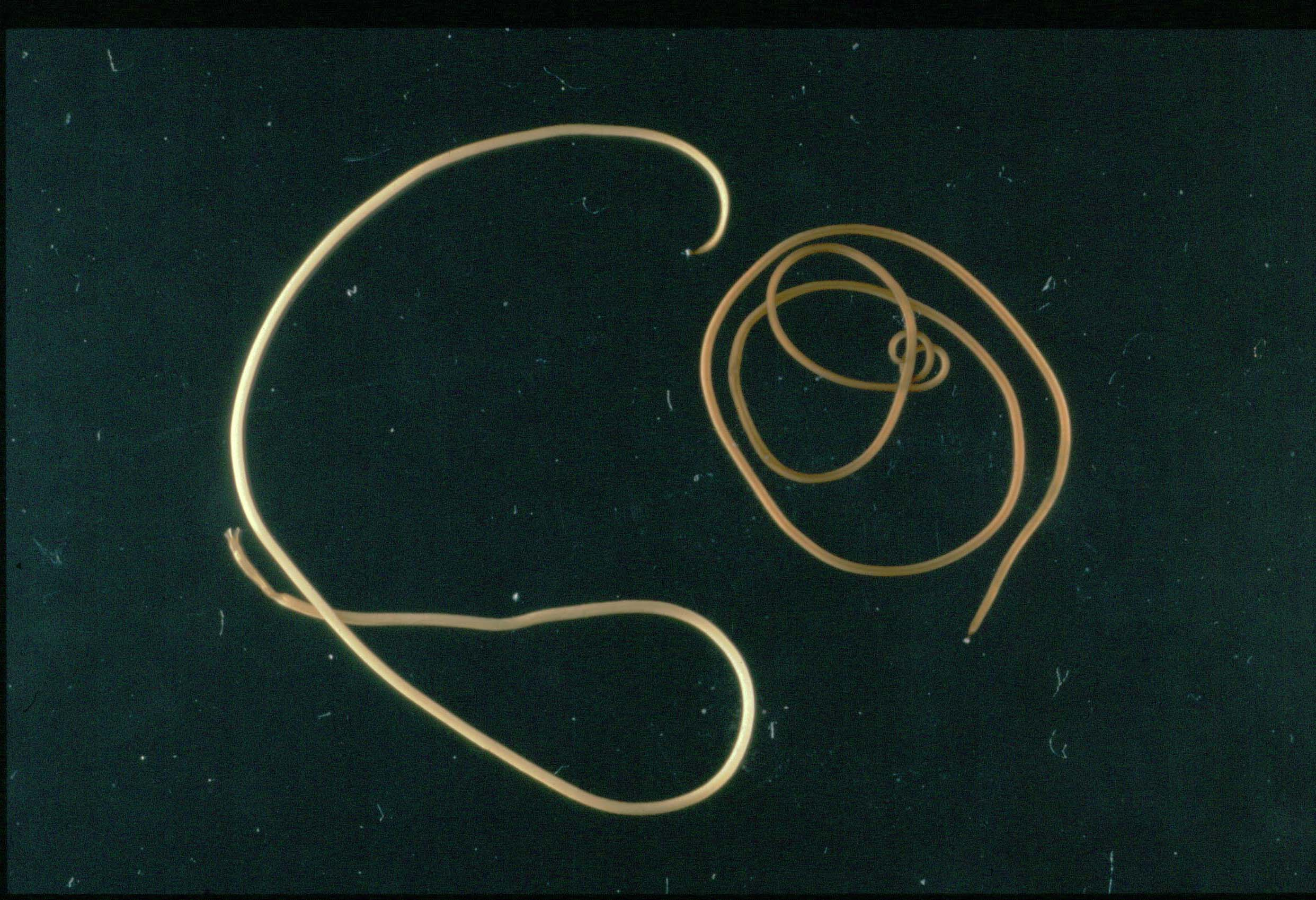
Paragordius tricuspidatus

1. Digordius Kirjanova, 1950
2. Paragordius Camerano, 1897
3. Progordius Kirjanova, 1950
4. Pseudogordius Yeh and Jordan, 1957

=== incertae sedis ===
1. Beatogordius Heinze, 1934
2. †Cretachordodes Poinar & Buckley, 2006
3. Gordionus Müller, 1927
4. Parachordodes Camerano, 1897
5. Paragordionus Heinze, 1935
6. Semigordionus Heinze, 1952
