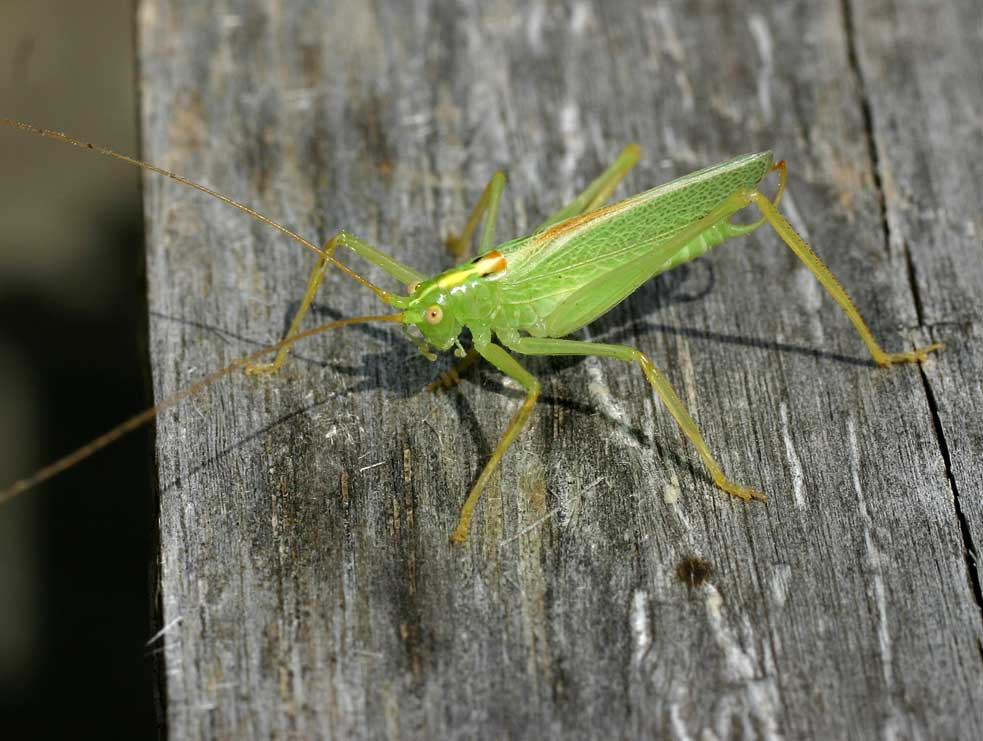

Scientific classification
- Kingdom: Animalia
- Phylum: Arthropoda
- Clade: Pancrustacea
- Class: Insecta
- Order: Orthoptera
- Suborder: Ensifera
- Family: Tettigoniidae
- Genus: Meconema
- Species: M. thalassinum

Binomial name
- Meconema thalassinum (De Geer, 1773)

= Meconema thalassinum =

Species of cricket-like animal

Meconema thalassinum is an insect in the family Tettigoniidae known as the oak bush-cricket and drumming katydid. It is native to Europe, including the British Isles, and was introduced to the United States, first established in the west of Long Island and extending its range to Rhode Island and Scarsdale, Stony Brook, and Ithaca, New York.

== Description ==
Close-Up of a Meconema thalassinum

M. thalassinum is a small bush cricket, reaching 20 mm (0.79 in) long, including the female's long ovipositor, although the antennae may reach a further 40 mm (1.6 in) in length. It lives in the foliage of trees, including oaks. Males attract females by making an almost inaudible noise by drumming on leaves. Females lay eggs singly under the bark of trees. Nymphs usually emerge in late-spring and reach maturity by late-summer.

Unlike other bush crickets, M. thalassinum is carnivorous. It feeds on smaller invertebrates such as larvae and caterpillars.

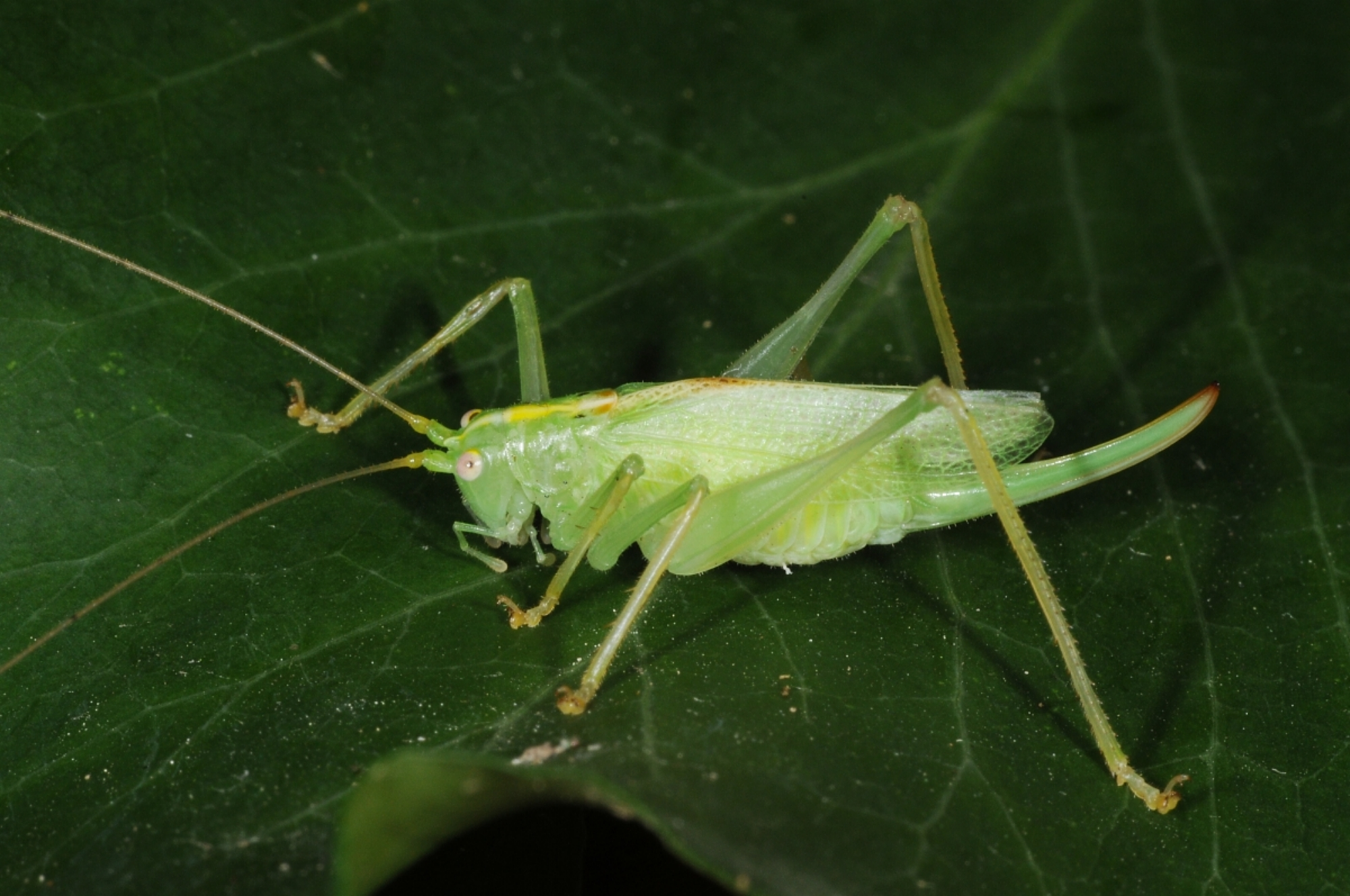
female

== Parasites ==
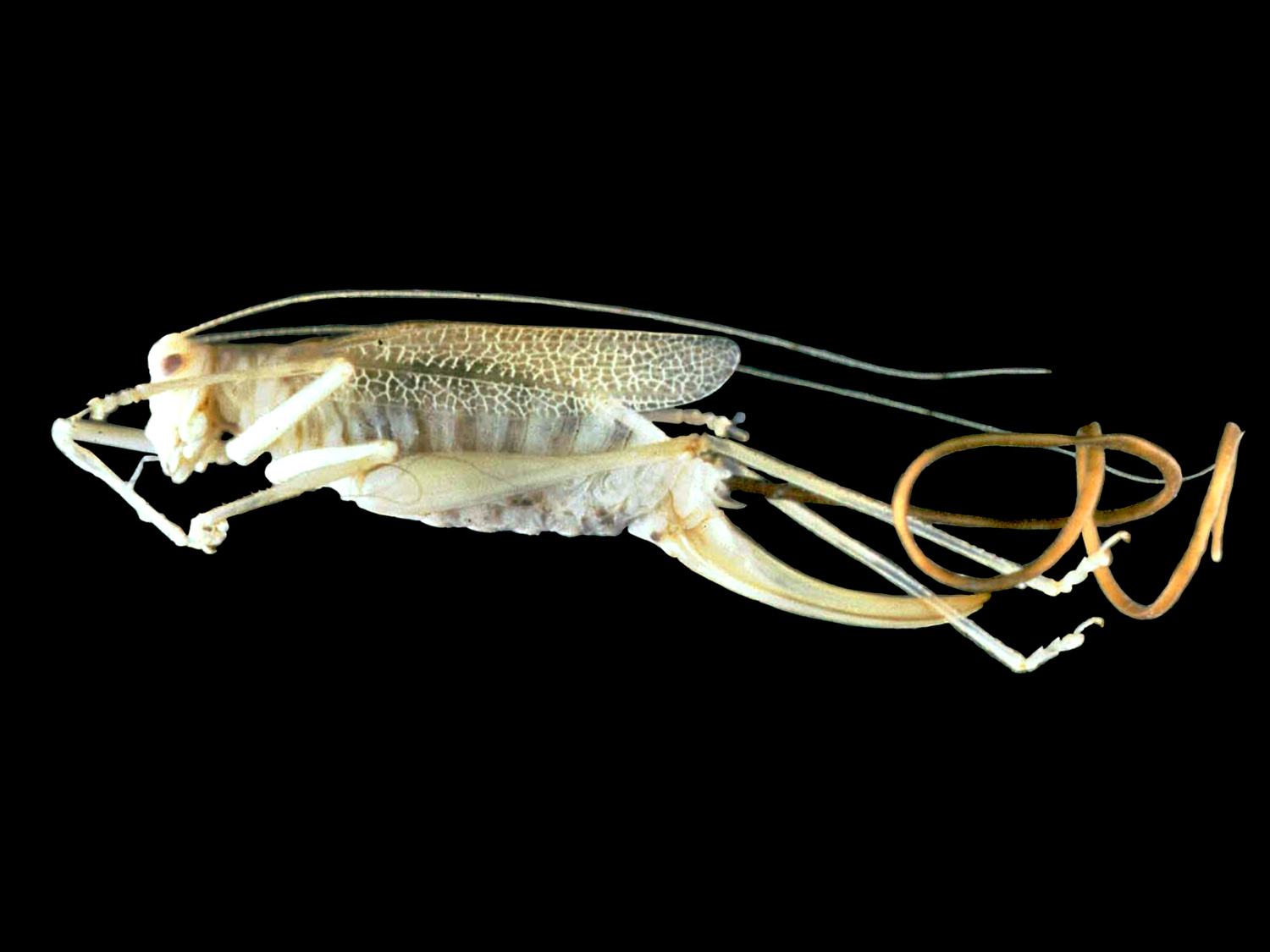
Spinochordodes tellinii and Meconema thalassinum

Meconema thalassinum is a host for the parasitic worm Spinochordodes tellinii. The parasite is able to change the behaviour of the insect making it more attracted to water when it is close to water. This is necessary because the parasite requires open water to complete its life cycle.

Sound of Meconema thalassinum
Field recording in the Netherlands 23s
