= Johann Gottfried Bremser =

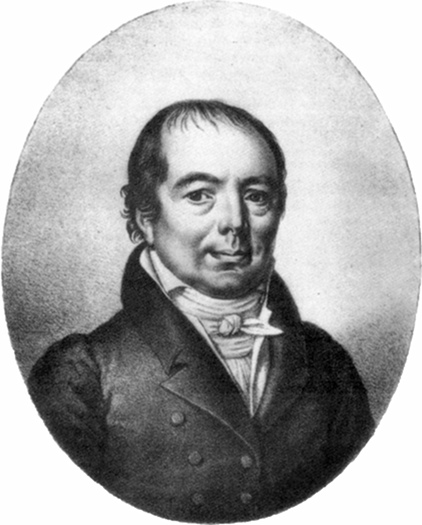
Johann Gottfried Bremser (lithograph, ca. 1820)

Johann Gottfried Bremser (19 August 1767 in Wertheim am Main – 21 August 1827 in Vienna) was a German-Austrian parasitologist and hygienist.

In 1796 he received his medical doctorate from the University of Jena, and following graduation, took a study tour through Germany, Switzerland and Italy. In 1797 he settled in Vienna as a physician. He developed an interest in the field of helminthology, and by way of a request from Carl Franz Anton Ritter von Schreibers, director of the Naturalienkabinette in Vienna, he started a helminth collection in around 1806, which eventually became one of the better parasitic worm collections in the world. In 1815 he conducted scientific research in Paris. In 1825 he succumbed to illness, and two years later died in Vienna at the age of 60.

He was at the forefront of medical vaccinations in Vienna, and argued the case for compulsory cowpox vaccinations for all citizens.

== Selected works ==
- Über die Kuhpocken, 1801 – (On cowpox).
- Über lebende Würmer im lebenden Menschen, 1819 (On living worms in living humans); later translated into French and published as Traité zoologique et physiologique sur les vers intestinaux de l'homme, 1824.
- Icones helminthum systema Rudolphii entozoologicum illustrantes, 1824.
