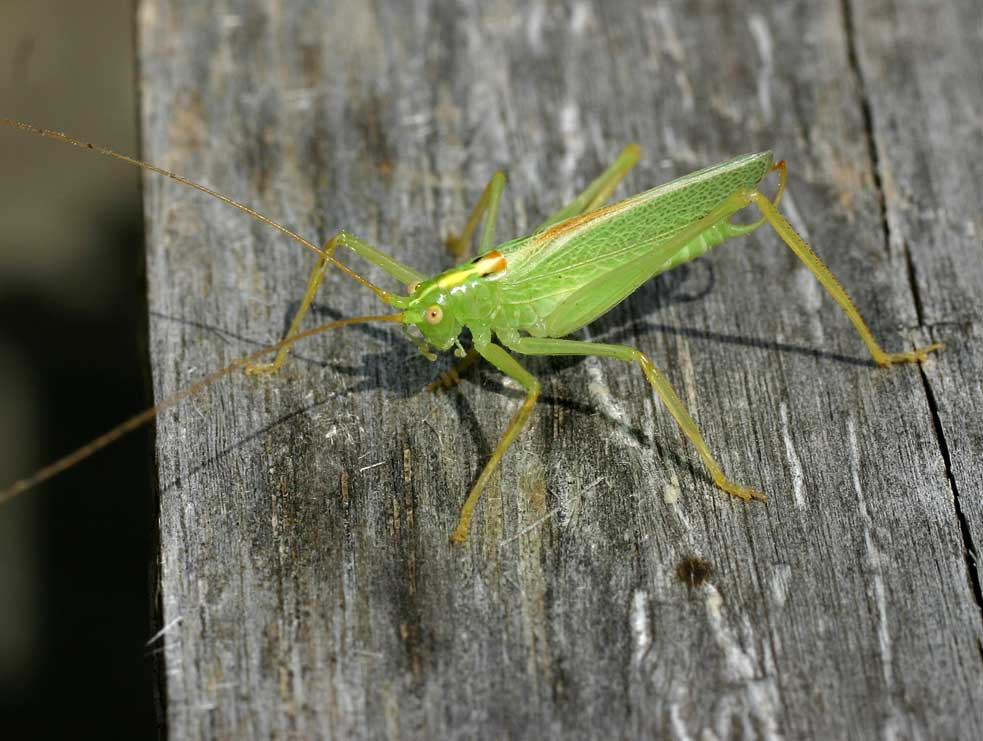
- Meconema thalassinum

Scientific classification
- Domain: Eukaryota
- Kingdom: Animalia
- Phylum: Arthropoda
- Class: Insecta
- Order: Orthoptera
- Suborder: Ensifera
- Family: Tettigoniidae
- Subfamily: Meconematinae
- Tribe: Meconematini
- Genus: Meconema; Serville 1831

= Meconema =

Genus of cricket-like animals

Meconema is the type genus of European bush crickets in the subfamily Meconematinae, tribe Meconematini and subtribe Meconematina.

== Species ==
The Orthoptera Species File includes:

1. Meconema meridionale Costa, 1860 - southern oak bush-cricket
2. Meconema thalassinum (De Geer, 1773) - oak bush-cricket - type species (as Locusta varia Fabricius)

The Japanese species Meconema subpunctatum has been reassigned to the genus Xiphidiopsis (X. subpunctata (Motschulsky, 1866))

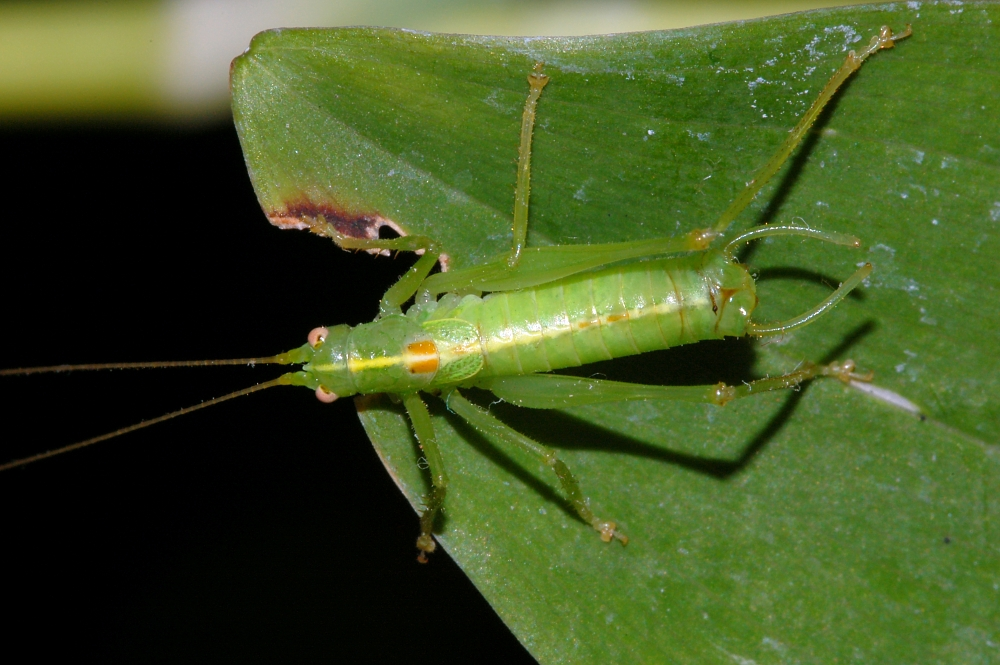
Meconema meridionale
