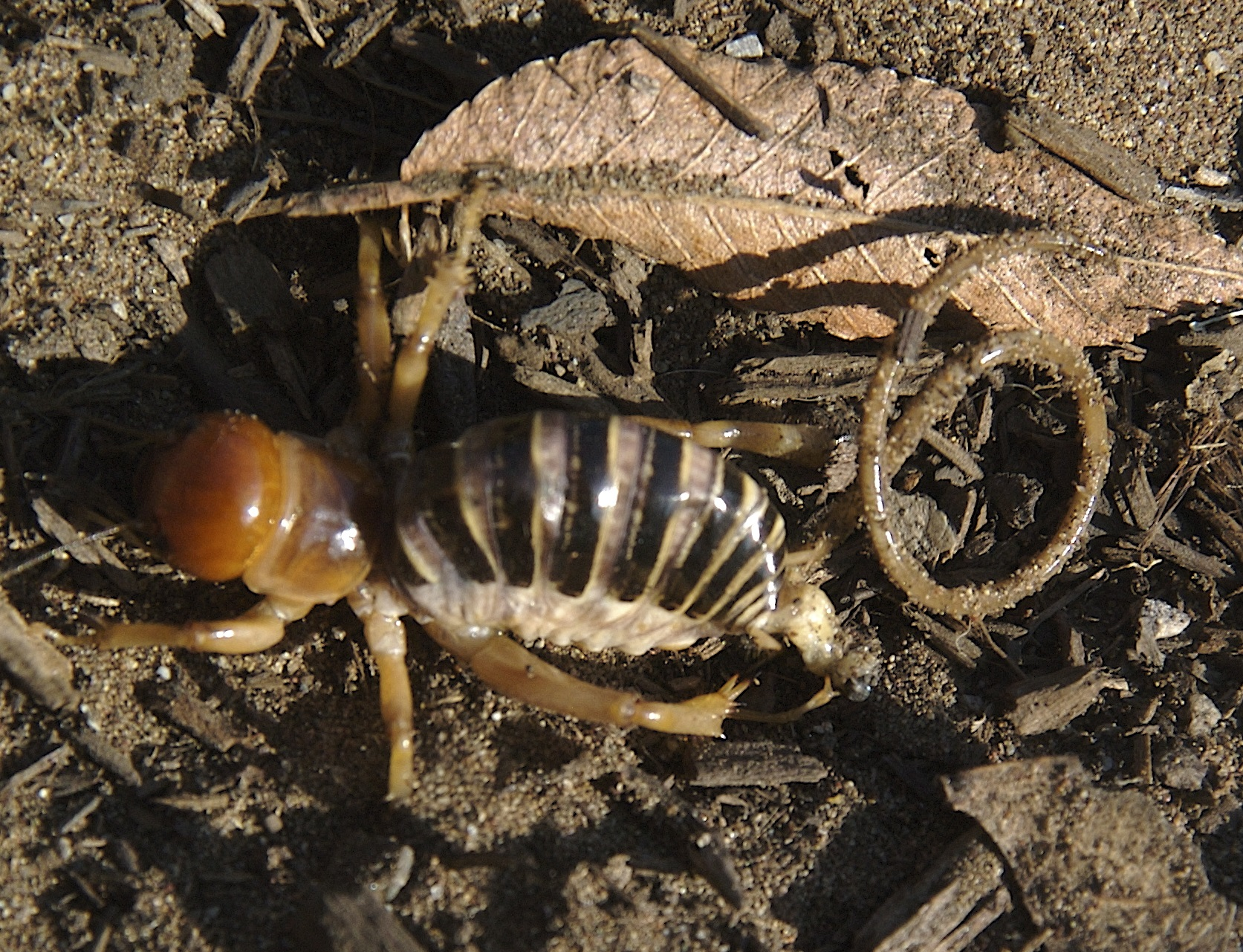
- Gordius sp. emerging from a Stenopelmatus cricket

Scientific classification
- Domain: Eukaryota
- Kingdom: Animalia
- Clade: Protostomia
- Superphylum: Ecdysozoa
- Clade: Nematoida
- Phylum: Nematomorpha
- Class: Gordioida
- Order: Gordioidea; Rauther, 1930

= Gordioidea =

Order of worms

Gordioidea is an order (sometimes placed at superfamily level) of parasitic horsehair worms. Its taxonomy remains uncertain, but appears to be contained in the monotypic class Gordioida and contains about 320 known species.

== Biology ==
Gordioidean adults are free-living in freshwater or semi-terrestrial habitats and larvae parasitise insects, primarily Orthopterans. Unlike Nectonematoideans, which are marine, gordioideans lack lateral rows of setae and have a single, ventral epidermal cord and their blastocoel is filled with mesenchyme in young worms but become open when older.

== Families and genera ==
The Integrated Taxonomic Information System lists the following genera in two families:

=== Chordodidae ===
Auth. May, 1919; selected genera:

Subfamily Chordodinae Heinze, 1935

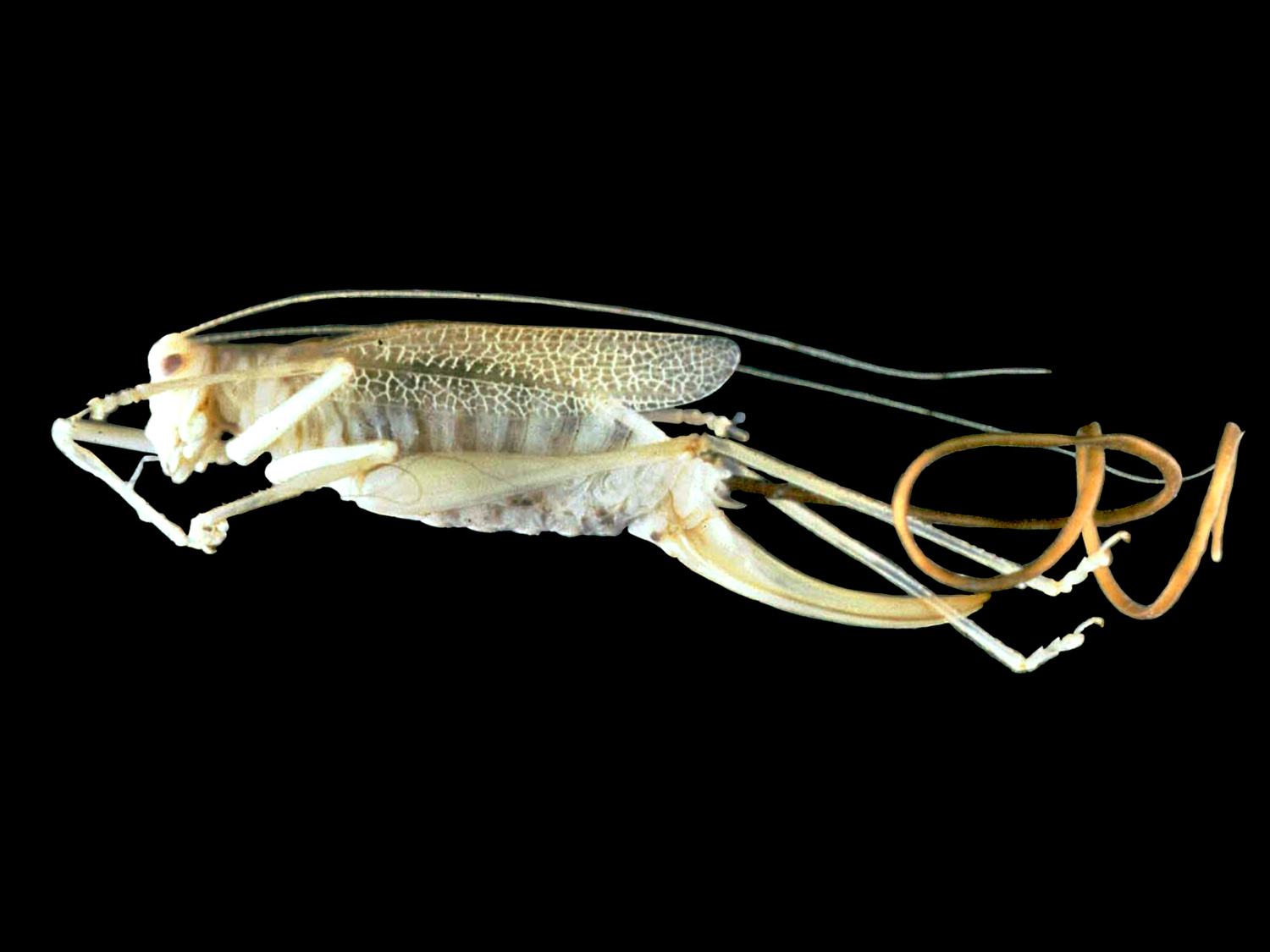
Spinochordodes tellinii and its Meconema host

- Chordodes Creplin, 1847
- Dacochordodes Capuse, 1965
- Euchordodes Heinze, 1937
- Neochordodes Carvalho, 1942
- Pantachordodes Heinze, 1954
- Spinochordodes Kirjanova, 1950

Subfamily Paragordiinae

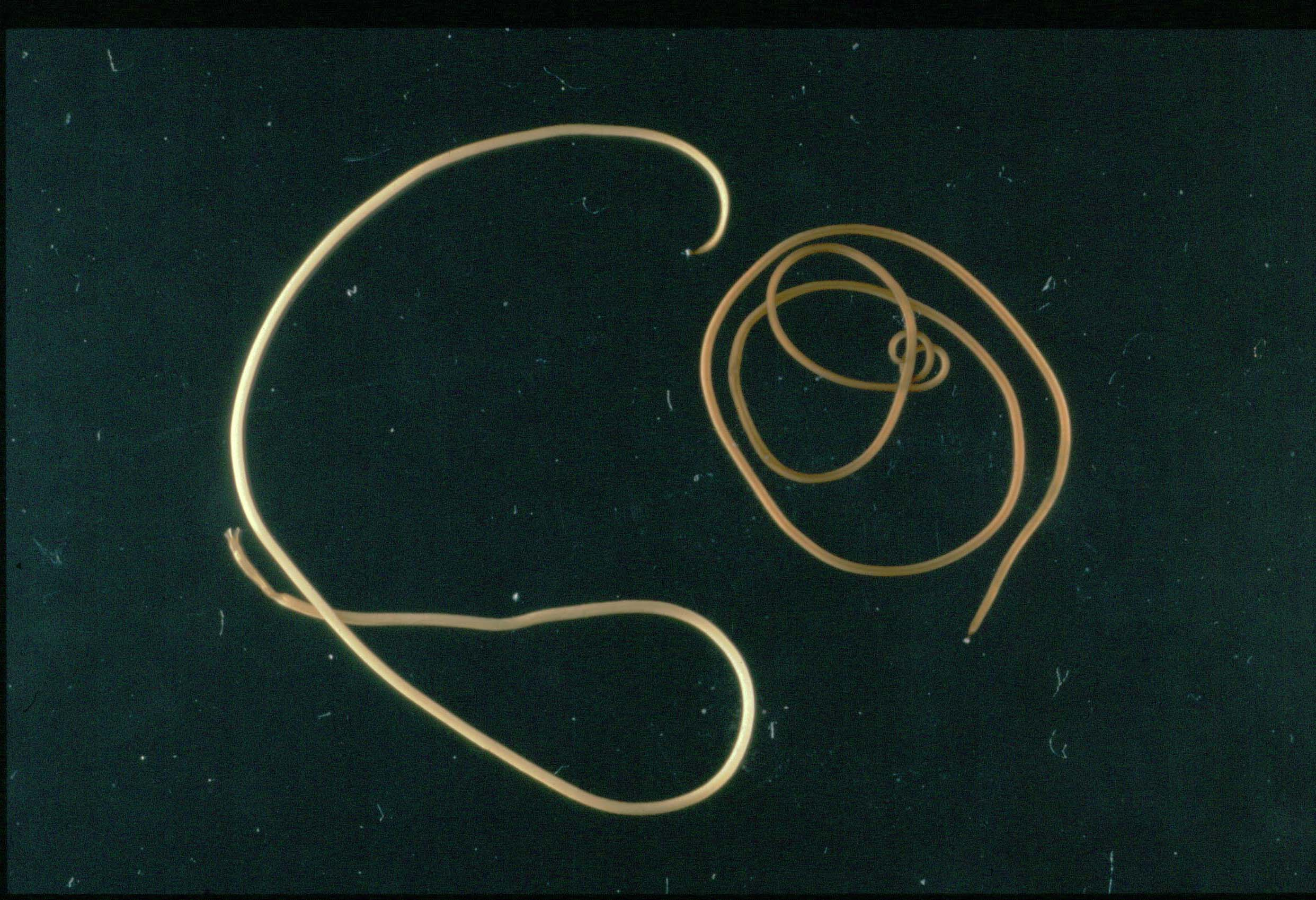
Paragordius tricuspidatus

- Paragordius Camerano, 1897

incertae sedis

- Gordionus Müller, 1927
- Parachordodes Camerano, 1897
- Paragordionus Heinze, 1935
- Semigordionus Heinze, 1952

=== Gordiidae ===
Auth. May, 1919

- Acutogordius Heinze, 1952
- Gordius Linnaeus, 1758
