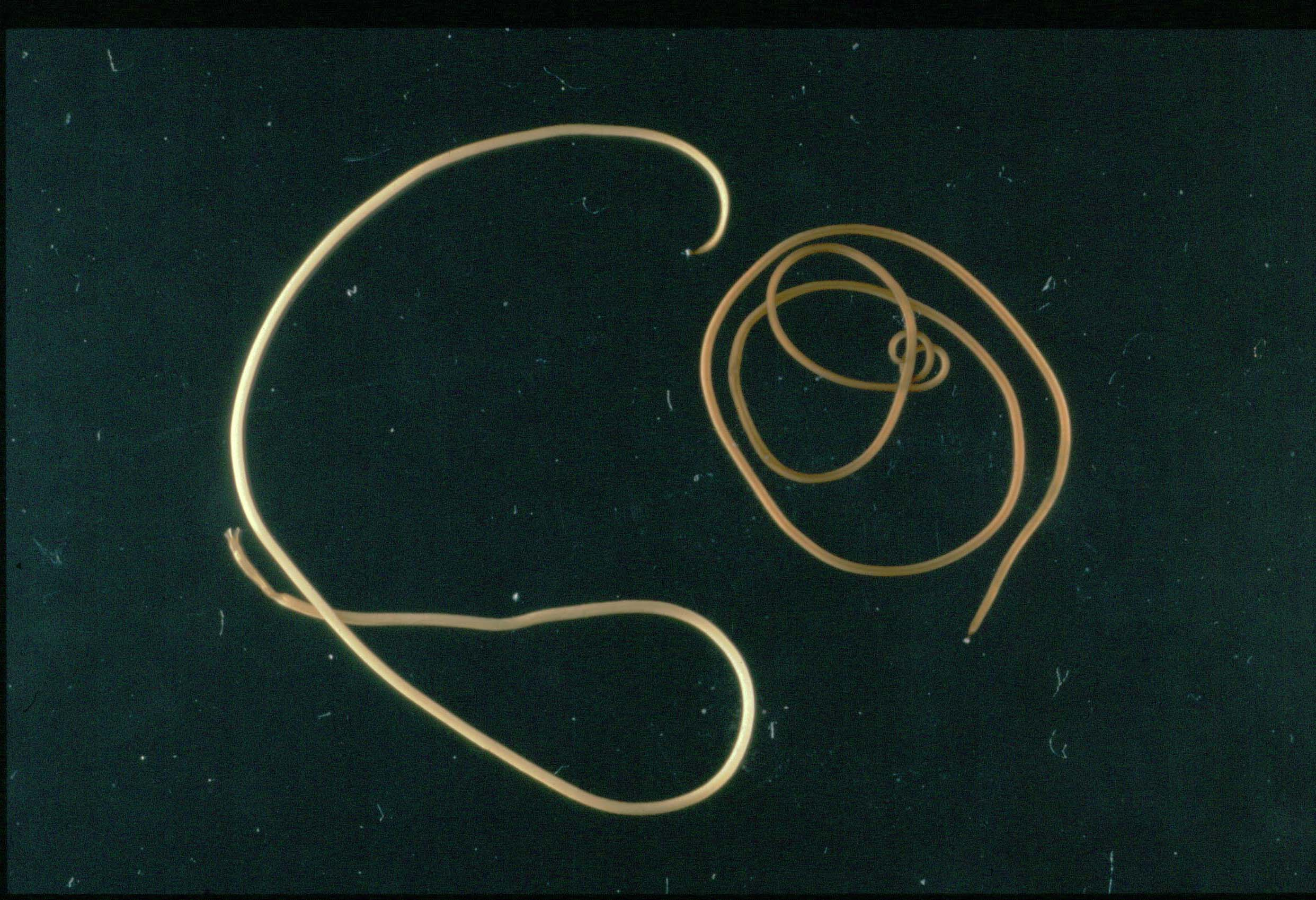
- Paragordius tricuspidatus

Scientific classification
- Kingdom: Animalia
- Subkingdom: Eumetazoa
- Clade: ParaHoxozoa
- Clade: Bilateria
- Clade: Nephrozoa
- Clade: Protostomia
- Superphylum: Ecdysozoa
- Clade: Nematoida
- Phylum: Nematomorpha; Vejdovsky, 1886

Orders and families
- Gordioidea Rauther, 1930; Chordodidae May, 1919; Gordiidae May, 1919; Nectonematoidea Rauther, 1930; Nectonemidae Ward, 1892

= Nematomorpha =

Nematomorpha Temporal range: Cenomanian–Recent Possible Atdabanian Record

Phylum of parasitoid animals; horsehair worms

Nematomorpha (sometimes called Gordiacea, and commonly known as horsehair worms, hairsnakes, or Gordian worms) are a phylum of parasitoid animals similar to yet distinct from nematode worms in morphology, hence the name. Most species range in size from 5 to 10 centimetres (2 to 4 in), reaching 2 metres (6 ft 7 in) in extreme cases, and 1 to 3 millimetres (0.039 to 0.118 in) in diameter. Horsehair worms can be discovered in damp areas, such as watering troughs, swimming pools, streams, puddles, and cisterns. The adult worms are free-living, but the larvae are parasitic on arthropods, such as beetles, cockroaches, mantises, orthopterans, and crustaceans. About 351 freshwater species are known and a conservative estimate suggests that there may be about 2000 freshwater species worldwide. The name "Gordian" stems from the legendary Gordian knot. This relates to the fact that nematomorphs often coil themselves in tight balls that resemble knots.

== Description and biology ==
Nematomorphs possess an external cuticle without cilia. Internally, they have only longitudinal muscle and a non-functional gut, with no excretory, respiratory or circulatory systems. The nervous system consists of a nerve ring near the anterior end of the animal and a ventral nerve cord running along the body.

Reproductively, they have two distinct sexes, with the internal fertilization of eggs that are then laid in gelatinous strings. Adults have cylindrical gonads, opening into the cloaca. The larvae have rings of cuticular hooks and terminal stylets that are believed to be used to enter the hosts. Once inside the host, the larvae live inside the haemocoel and absorb nutrients directly through their skin. Development into the adult form takes weeks or months, and the larva moults several times as it grows in size. Depending on species, a mouth can be either absent or present in adults. Also the pharynx can be absent, cellular in structure or a cuticularized tube.

The adults are mostly free-living in freshwater or marine environments, and males and females aggregate into tight balls (Gordian knots) during mating.

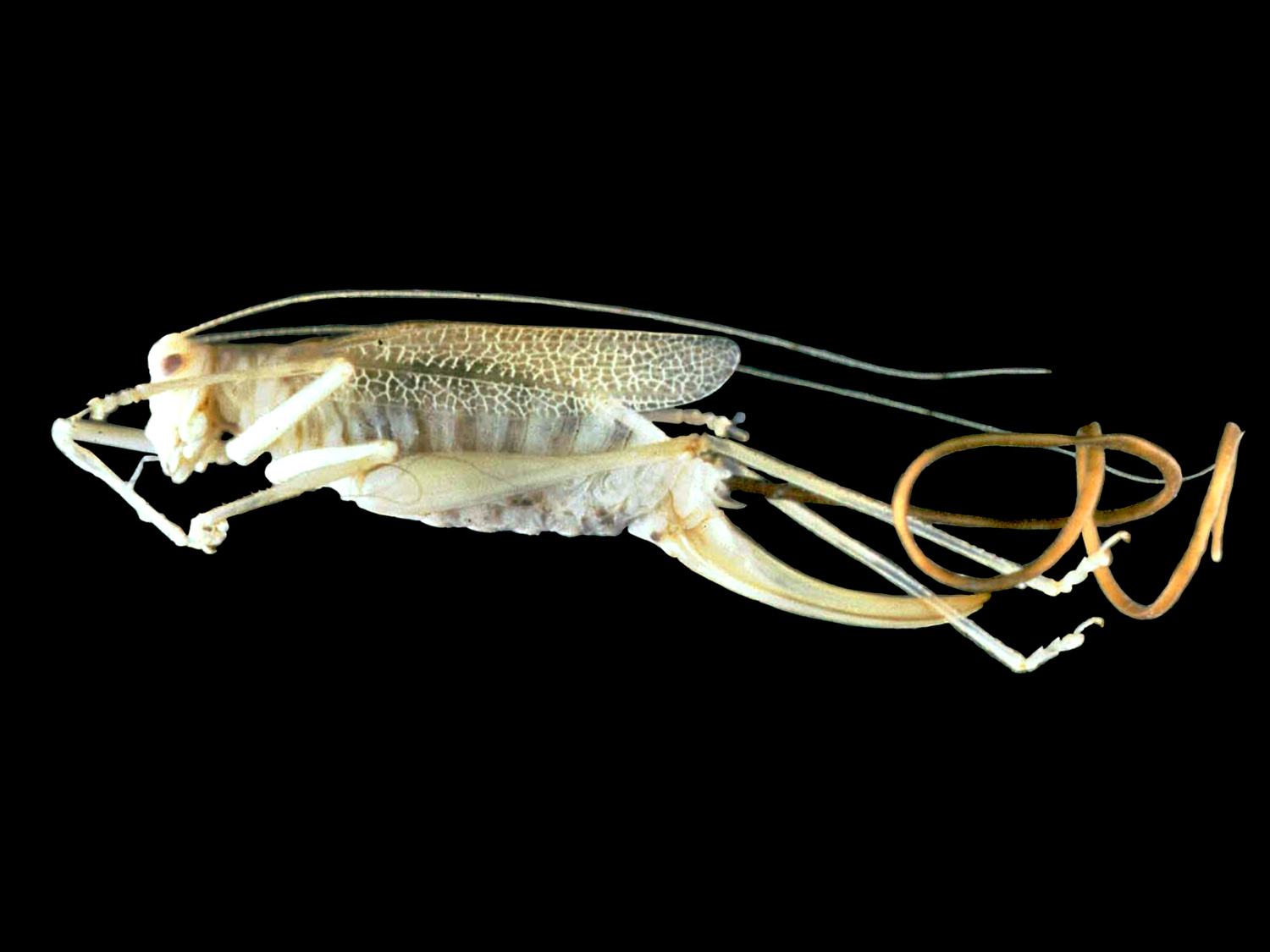
Spinochordodes tellinii and its Meconema host

In Spinochordodes tellinii and Paragordius tricuspidatus, which have grasshoppers and crickets as their hosts, the infection acts on the infected host's brain. This causes the host insect to seek water and drown itself, thus returning the nematomorph to water — according to Thomas et al., the "infected insects may first display an erratic behaviour which brings them sooner or later close to a stream and then a behavioural change that makes them enter the water", rather than seeking out water over long distances. Paragordius tricuspidatus is also remarkably able to survive the predation of their host, being able to wiggle out of the predator that has eaten the host. Similarly, Chordodes sp. nematomorphs affect the light-interpreting organs of Hierodula patellifera mantises so the host is attracted to horizontally polarized light. Thus the host goes into water and the parasite's lifecycle completes. Many of the genes the parasites use for manipulating their host have been acquired through horizontal gene transfer from the host genome.

There are a few cases of accidental parasitism in vertebrate hosts, including dogs, cats, and humans. Several cases involving Parachordodes, Paragordius, or Gordius have been recorded in human hosts in Japan.

== Life cycle and development ==
The Nematomorpha life cycle consists of four stages: (1) the egg, (2) the pre-parasitic larva, (3) the parasitic larva, and (4) the free-living aquatic adult. Throughout these four stages, the worms parasitize multiple invertebrate hosts, inhabiting different environments.

Freshwater worms typically mate in the spring, depositing their strings of eggs in the water. Within 3 to 4 weeks, pre-parasitic larvae emerge from these eggs. These larvae must parasitize an invertebrate host — their primary hosts being larger arthropod species, such as mantids, beetles, dragonflies, crickets, and grasshoppers. Some studies report that mantids are among the most important primary hosts of Nematomorpha in tropical and subtropical regions.

The Nematomorpha life cycle often includes multiple hosts. If aquatic larvae are fortunate enough to be ingested by a primary host organism, they will then continue their development into adults. However, it is much more common that they seek out an intermediate host, usually aquatic invertebrate larvae (e.g. mayfly larvae, mosquito larvae, or chironomid larvae). Once larvae find themselves in an intermediate host, they encyst themselves in the host's body cavity. These parasites leverage aquatic insects as vehicles to move from water to land, retaining viable cysts through metamorphosis. Once conditions to continue development are met (i.e. the intermediate host is eaten by a primary host), they will reemerge from this cyst and infect the primary host.

Some pre-parasitic freshwater Nematomorpha larvae are known to encyst themselves on debris or vegetation. If they are ingested by a primary host organism (such as a millipede) in this state, they will then progress into the parasitic stage.

== Community ecology ==
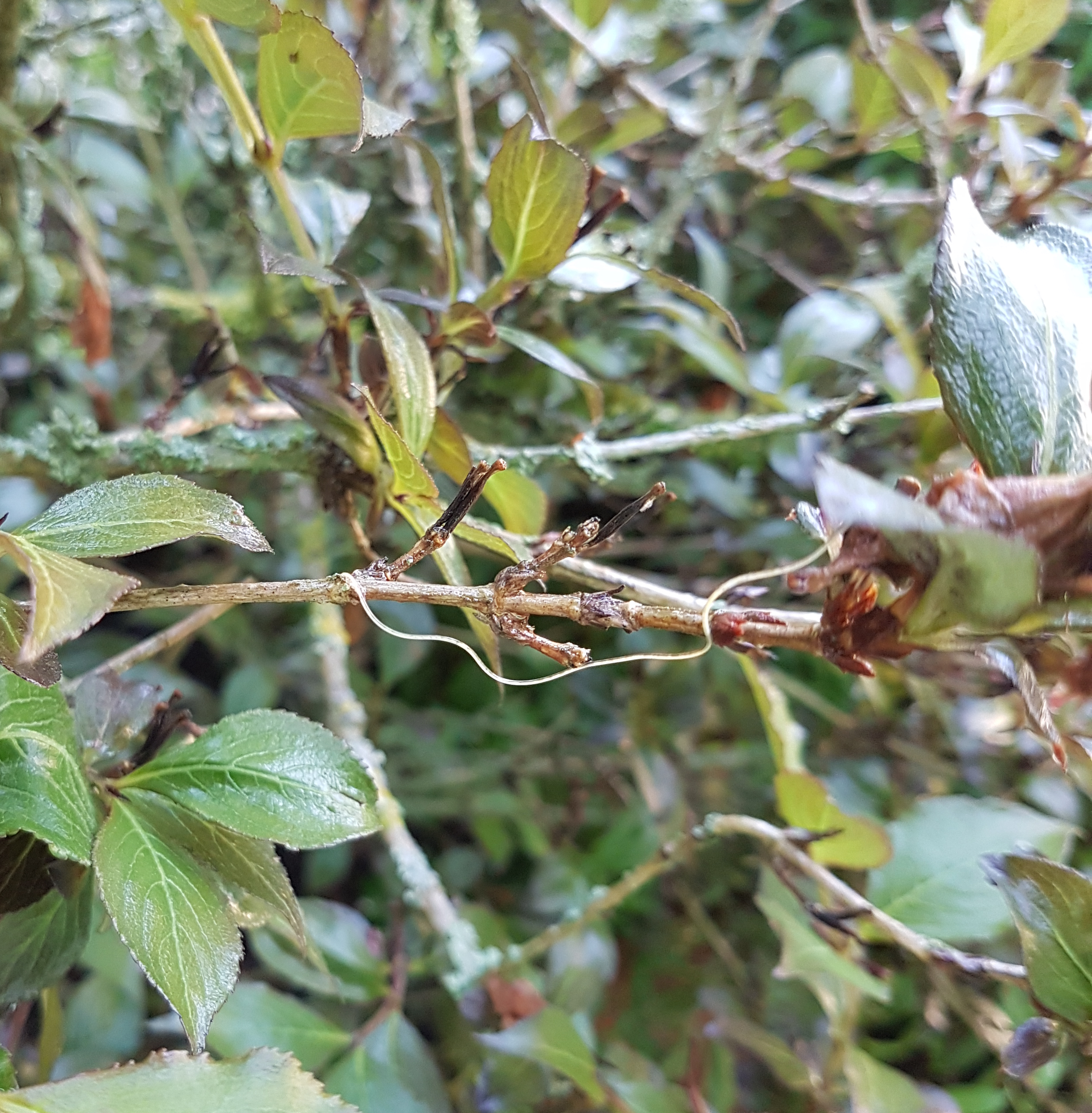
Mermithid worm (Phylum Nematoda), often confused with horsehair worms (Phylum Nematomorpha). Dark structures are eggs, not seen in horsehair worms. Germany 2021.

Owing to their use of orthopterans as hosts, nematomorphs can be significant factors in shaping community ecology. One study conducted in a Japanese riparian ecosystem showed that nematomorphs could cause orthopterans to become 20 times more likely to enter water than uninfected orthopterans; these orthopterans constituted up to 60% of the annual energy intake for the Kirikuchi char. The absence of nematomorphs from riparian communities can thus lead to char preying more heavily on other aquatic invertebrates, potentially causing more widespread physiological effects.

== Taxonomy ==
Nematomorphs can be confused with nematodes, particularly mermithid worms. Unlike nematomorphs, mermithids do not have a terminal cloaca. Male mermithids have one or two spicules just before the end, apart from having a thinner, smoother cuticle without areoles and paler brown colour.

The phylum is placed along with the Ecdysozoa clade of moulting organisms that include the Arthropoda. Their closest relatives are the nematodes. The two phyla make up the group Nematoida in the clade Cycloneuralia. During the larval stage, the animals show a resemblance to adult kinorhyncha and some species of Loricifera and Priapulida, all members of the group Scalidophora. The earliest nematomorph could be Maotianshania, from the Lower Cambrian; this organism is, however, very different from extant species; fossilized worms resembling the modern forms have been reported from mid Cretaceous Burmese amber dated to 100 million years ago.

Relationships within the phylum are still somewhat unclear, but two classes are recognised. The five marine species of nematomorph are contained in Nectonematoida. This order is monotypic containing the genus Nectonema Verrill, 1879: adults are planktonic and the larvae parasitise decapod crustaceans, especially crabs. They are characterized by a double row of natotory setae along each side of the body, dorsal and ventral longitudinal epidermal cords, a spacious and fluid-filled blastocoelom and singular gonads.

The approximately 320 remaining species are distributed between two families, within the monotypic class Gordioida. Gordioidean adults are free-living in freshwater or semiterrestrial habitats and larvae parasitise insects, primarily orthopterans. Unlike nectonematiodeans, gordioideans lack lateral rows of setae, have a single, ventral epidermal cord and their blastocoels are filled with mesenchyme in young animals but become spacious in older individuals.
