= Eoxizicus =

Scientific classification
- Domain: Eukaryota
- Kingdom: Animalia
- Phylum: Arthropoda
- Class: Insecta
- Order: Orthoptera
- Suborder: Ensifera
- Family: Tettigoniidae
- Subfamily: Meconematinae
- Tribe: Meconematini
- Genus: Eoxizicus; Gorochov, 1993

Synonyms
- Xizicus subgenus Eoxizicus Gorochov, 1993

Genus of cricket-like animals

External image
- Images at iNaturalist

Eoxizicus is a genus (or subgenus) of Asian bush crickets belonging to the tribe Meconematini. The recorded distribution is: India, Indochina, China and Korea.

== Subgenera and species ==
Species have been placed here or at the original subgenus level as Xizicus (Eoxizicus). The Orthoptera Species File currently lists:

1. Eoxizicus bihammeris Liu, 2020
2. Eoxizicus bimaculus (Liu, Chen, Wang & Chang, 2019)
3. Eoxizicus choui (Liu & Zhang, 2000)
4. Eoxizicus concavilaminus (Jin, 1999)
5. Eoxizicus coreanus (Bey-Bienko, 1971)
6. Eoxizicus danangi Gorochov, 1998
7. Eoxizicus dao Gorochov, 1998
8. Eoxizicus dentatus (Liu, Chen, Wang & Chang, 2019)
9. Eoxizicus dischidus Di, Han & Shi, 2015
10. Eoxizicus divergentis (Liu & Zhang, 2000)
11. Eoxizicus dubius (Liu & Zhang, 2000)
12. Eoxizicus duplum (Gorochov, 1998)
13. Eoxizicus fengyangshanensis Liu, Zhou & Bi, 2010
14. Eoxizicus furcutus Jiao & Shi, 2014
15. Eoxizicus gaoligongshanensis (Cui, Liu & Shi, 2020)
16. Eoxizicus hainani Gorochov & Kang, 2005
17. Eoxizicus hsiehi (Liu, Chen, Wang & Chang, 2019)
18. Eoxizicus howardi (Tinkham, 1956)
19. Eoxizicus hue Gorochov, 2005
20. Eoxizicus khaosoki Gorochov, 1998
21. Eoxizicus kulingensis (Tinkham, 1943) - type species (as Xiphidiopsis kulingensis Tinkham), locality Guling, Guangxi
22. Eoxizicus laminatus Shi, 2013
23. Eoxizicus lobicercus (Chen, Mao & Chang, 2019)
24. Eoxizicus magnus (Xia & Liu, 1992)
25. Eoxizicus megalobatus (Xia & Liu, 1990)
26. Eoxizicus meridianus (Xia & Liu, 1990)
27. Eoxizicus orlovi Gorochov, 2005
28. Eoxizicus parallelus (Liu & Zhang, 2000)
29. Eoxizicus rehni (Tinkham, 1956)
30. Eoxizicus ryabovi Gorochov, 2005
31. Eoxizicus simianshanensis Wang & Shi, 2017
32. Eoxizicus simplicicercis (Kevan & Jin, 1993)
33. Eoxizicus sinuatus (Liu & Zhang, 2000)
34. Eoxizicus streptocercus Jiao & Shi, 2014
35. Eoxizicus taiwanensis Chang, Du & Shi, 2013
36. Eoxizicus tam Gorochov, 1998
37. Eoxizicus tinkhami (Bey-Bienko, 1962)
38. Eoxizicus transversus (Tinkham, 1944)
39. Eoxizicus tuberculatus (Liu & Zhang, 2000)
40. Eoxizicus uncicercus Mao & Shi, 2015
41. Eoxizicus wuzhishanensis (Liu & Zhang, 2000)
42. Eoxizicus xiai (Liu & Zhang, 2000) (synonym E. curvicercus (Wang, Liu & Li, 2015))
