= Macroteratura =

Scientific classification
- Domain: Eukaryota
- Kingdom: Animalia
- Phylum: Arthropoda
- Class: Insecta
- Order: Orthoptera
- Suborder: Ensifera
- Family: Tettigoniidae
- Subfamily: Meconematinae
- Tribe: Meconematini
- Genus: Macroteratura; Gorochov, 1993

Synonyms
- Macroteraturus Liu & Yin, 2004; Macroteratura (Macroteratura) Gorochov, 1993; Macroteratura (Stenoteratura) Gorochov, 1993

Genus of cricket-like animals

Macroteratura is a genus of Asian bush crickets belonging to the tribe Meconematini in the subfamily Meconematinae. The genus was erected by AV Gorochov in 1993 as a subgenus of Teratura (Macroteratura). Species also have been described previously in Kuzicus (Macroteraturus) before being placed in this genus in 2020; records are from China and Vietnam (but the known distribution may be incomplete).

== Species ==
The Orthoptera Species File lists the following species:

subgenus Macroteratura Gorochov, 1993

1. Macroteratura inospina Chen, Cui & Chang, 2020
2. Macroteratura megafurcula (Tinkham, 1944)
  - type species (as Xiphidiopsis megafurcula Tinkham); locality: Maan Chi Shan, Guangdong, SE China
3. Macroteratura sinica (Bey-Bienko, 1957)
4. Macroteratura thrinaca (Qiu & Shi, 2010)

subgenus Stenoteratura Gorochov, 1993

1. Macroteratura bhutanica (Ingrisch, 2002)
2. Macroteratura janetscheki (Bey-Bienko, 1968)
3. Macroteratura kryzhanovskii (Bey-Bienko, 1957)
4. Macroteratura twinsloba Liu, 2020
5. Macroteratura yunnanea (Bey-Bienko, 1957)
