= Amyttacta =

Scientific classification
- Domain: Eukaryota
- Kingdom: Animalia
- Phylum: Arthropoda
- Class: Insecta
- Order: Orthoptera
- Suborder: Ensifera
- Family: Tettigoniidae
- Subfamily: Meconematinae
- Tribe: Meconematini
- Genus: Amyttacta; Beier, 1965

Species
- See text

Genus of cricket-like animals

Amyttacta is a genus of bush-crickets or katydids, which contains the following species:

- Amyttacta angolensis Beier, 1965
- Amyttacta rhodesica Beier, 1965

Note: A. farrelli and A. marakelensis Naskrecki, Bazelet & Spearman, 2008 are now placed in the genus Naskreckia Gorochov, 2017.
