= Neocononicephora storozhenkoi =

Scientific classification
- Kingdom: Animalia
- Phylum: Arthropoda
- Class: Insecta
- Order: Orthoptera
- Suborder: Ensifera
- Family: Tettigoniidae
- Subfamily: Meconematinae
- Tribe: Meconematini
- Genus: Neocononicephora
- Species: N. storozhenkoi

Binomial name
- Neocononicephora storozhenkoi (Gorochov, 1994)

Synonyms
- Cononicephora storozhenkoi Gorochov, 1994

Species of cricket-like animal

Neocononicephora storozhenkoi is the type species of the genus Neocononicephora: an Asian bush cricket, belonging to the tribe Meconematini.
