= Cyrtaspis tuberculata =

Conservation status
- Data Deficient (IUCN 3.1)

Scientific classification
- Kingdom: Animalia
- Phylum: Arthropoda
- Class: Insecta
- Order: Orthoptera
- Suborder: Ensifera
- Family: Tettigoniidae
- Subfamily: Meconematinae
- Tribe: Meconematini
- Genus: Cyrtaspis
- Species: C. tuberculata

Binomial name
- Cyrtaspis tuberculata Barranco, 2006

Species of cricket-like animal

Cyrtaspis tuberculata is a species of European bush crickets belonging to the subfamily Meconematinae; no subspecies are listed in the Catalogue of Life.

This species is found in the Iberian Peninsula; belonging to the tribe Meconematini it has been called the warty oak bush-cricket.
