= Chandozhinskia =

Scientific classification
- Domain: Eukaryota
- Kingdom: Animalia
- Phylum: Arthropoda
- Class: Insecta
- Order: Orthoptera
- Suborder: Ensifera
- Family: Tettigoniidae
- Subfamily: Meconematinae
- Tribe: Meconematini
- Genus: Chandozhinskia; Gorochov, 1993

Genus of cricket-like animals

Chandozhinskia is a genus of bush crickets found in Asia, belonging to the tribe Meconematini (subfamily Meconematinae). They are found in Indochina and central and southern China.

== Species ==
Both species were previously placed in the genus Xiphidiopsis and are now classified as follows:

- Chandozhinskia bivittata (Bey-Bienko, 1957) – type species (as Xiphidiopsis bivittata = subspecies bivittata)
  - C. bivittata bivittata (Bey-Bienko, 1957) holotype locality: Simao, Yunnan, China
  - C. bivittata vietnamica Gorochov, 2011 - Phú Lương District, now in Thái Nguyên Province, Vietnam
- Chandozhinskia hastaticercus (Tinkham, 1936) - China, Vietnam
