= Pseudokuzicus =

Scientific classification
- Domain: Eukaryota
- Kingdom: Animalia
- Phylum: Arthropoda
- Class: Insecta
- Order: Orthoptera
- Suborder: Ensifera
- Family: Tettigoniidae
- Subfamily: Meconematinae
- Tribe: Meconematini
- Genus: Pseudokuzicus; Gorochov, 1993

Genus of cricket-like animals

Pseudokuzicus is a genus of Asian bush crickets belonging to the tribe Meconematini: in the subfamily Meconematinae. They are found in Vietnam and southern China.

== Species ==
The Orthoptera Species File lists the following species, placed in two subgenera:

Subgenus Pseudokuzicus Gorochov, 1993

- Pseudokuzicus acinacus Shi, Mao & Chang, 2007
- Pseudokuzicus furcicaudus (Mu, He & Wang, 2000)
- Pseudokuzicus pieli (Tinkham, 1943) – type species (as Xiphidiopsis pieli Tinkham, 1943)
- Pseudokuzicus platynus Di, Bian, Shi & Chang, 2014
- Pseudokuzicus spinus Shi, Mao & Chang, 2007
- Pseudokuzicus tamdao Gorochov, 1998
- Pseudokuzicus trianglus Di, Bian, Shi & Chang, 2014

Subgenus Similkuzicus Shi, Mao & Chang, 2007

- Pseudokuzicus longidentatus Chang, Zheng & Wang, 1998
- Pseudokuzicus quadridentatus Shi, Mao & Chang, 2007
