= Neoxizicus =

Scientific classification
- Domain: Eukaryota
- Kingdom: Animalia
- Phylum: Arthropoda
- Class: Insecta
- Order: Orthoptera
- Suborder: Ensifera
- Family: Tettigoniidae
- Subfamily: Meconematinae
- Tribe: Meconematini
- Genus: Neoxizicus; Gorochov, 1998

Genus of cricket-like animals

Neoxizicus is a monotypic genus of Asian bush crickets belonging to the tribe Meconematini in the subfamily Meconematinae. It is only found in Vietnam.

== Species ==
The Orthoptera Species File currently lists the sole type species: Neoxizicus crassus Gorochov, 1998: from Tam Dao village, Vinh Phu Province.

Note: "Neoxizicus longipennis" Liu & Zhang, 2000 from Yunnan, has now been placed in the genus Tamdaora.
