= Athaumaspis =

Scientific classification
- Domain: Eukaryota
- Kingdom: Animalia
- Phylum: Arthropoda
- Class: Insecta
- Order: Orthoptera
- Suborder: Ensifera
- Family: Tettigoniidae
- Subfamily: Meconematinae
- Tribe: Meconematini
- Genus: Athaumaspis; Wang & Liu, 2014

Genus of cricket-like animals

Athaumaspis is a genus of Asian bush crickets belonging to the tribe Meconematini in the subfamily Meconematinae. The genus was erected by Wang et al. after a revision of the genus Thaumaspis; species are found in Tibet, China, and Vietnam.

== Species ==
The Orthoptera Species File lists the following species:

1. Athaumaspis bifurcatus (Liu, Zhou & Bi, 2010) - Fengyangshan National Nature Reserve, Zhejiang, China
2. Athaumaspis minutus Wang & Liu, 2014 - type species locality: Mount Lang Bian, Vietnam
3. Athaumaspis tibetanus Wang & Liu, 2014 - Tibet
