= Acilacris rentzi =

Conservation status
- Least Concern (IUCN 3.1)

Scientific classification
- Kingdom: Animalia
- Phylum: Arthropoda
- Clade: Pancrustacea
- Class: Insecta
- Order: Orthoptera
- Suborder: Ensifera
- Family: Tettigoniidae
- Genus: Acilacris
- Subgenus: Aroegas
- Species: A. rentzi

Binomial name
- Acilacris rentzi (Naskrecki, 1996)

Synonyms
- Aroegas rentzi Naskrecki, 1996

Species of cricket-like animal

Acilacris rentzi, or Rentz's false shieldback, is a species of katydid that is endemic to South Africa, and can be found in Limpopo, Mpumalanga, KwaZulu-Natal and Eastern Cape provinces.
