= Neophisis =

Scientific classification
- Domain: Eukaryota
- Kingdom: Animalia
- Phylum: Arthropoda
- Class: Insecta
- Order: Orthoptera
- Suborder: Ensifera
- Family: Tettigoniidae
- Subfamily: Meconematinae
- Tribe: Phisidini
- Genus: Neophisis; Jin, 1990

Genus of cricket-like animals

External image
- Images at iNaturalist

Neophisis is a genus of Asian bush crickets belonging to the tribe Phisidini: in the subfamily Meconematinae.

== Species ==
The Orthoptera Species File lists:

subgenus Anaphisis Gorochov, 2019

Distribution: New Guinea

- Neophisis halmahera Gorochov, 2012
- Neophisis supiori Gorochov, 2004

subgenus Indophisis Jin, 1990

Distribution: Indochina, Malesia, Philippines, Taiwan, Japan

- Neophisis brevipennis (Kästner, 1933)
- Neophisis curvata Jin, 1992
- Neophisis gracilipennis Jin, 1992
- Neophisis gracilipes (Stål, 1877)
- Neophisis iriomotensis Jin, Kevan & Yamasaki, 1990
- Neophisis kotoshoensis (Shiraki, 1930)
- Neophisis longipennis Jin, 1992
- Neophisis meiopennis Jin, 1992
- Neophisis mentawaiensis Jin, 1992
- Neophisis montealegrei Tan, Jin, Baroga-Barbecho & Yap, 2020
- Neophisis philippinarum (Karny, 1920)
- Neophisis philorites Jin, 1992
- Neophisis sarasini (Karny, 1931)
- Neophisis tangkoko Gorochov, 2012

subgenus Megaphisis Kevan, 1992

Distribution: Pacific Islands

- Neophisis echinata (Redtenbacher, 1891)
- Neophisis salomonensis Jin, 1992

subgenus Neophisis Jin, 1990

Distribution: Australia, New Guinea, Malesia (including the Philippines)

- Neophisis arachnoides (Bolívar, 1905) - type species (as Teuthras arachnoides Bolívar)
- Neophisis brachyptera Kevan, 1992
- Neophisis buloloensis Jin, 1992
- Neophisis crassipes (Bolívar, 1905)
- Neophisis curvicaudata Jin, 1992
- Neophisis ecmurra Rentz, 2001
- Neophisis leptoptera Jin, 1992
- Neophisis longicercata Jin, 1992
- Neophisis longifenestrata Jin, 1992
- Neophisis longiplata Jin, 1992
- Neophisis longistylata Jin, 1992
- Neophisis megaurita Jin, 1992
- Neophisis novemspinata Jin, 1992
- Neophisis obiensis (Hebard, 1922)
- Neophisis phymacercata Jin, 1992
- Neophisis pogonopoda (Montrouzier, 1855)
- Neophisis robusta Jin, 1992

subgenus Platyphisis Gorochov, 2019

Distribution: Thailand through to Borneo

- Neophisis arcuata Jin, 1992
- Neophisis haani Jin, 1992
- Neophisis malaysiana Gorochov, 2019
- Neophisis sabah Gorochov, 2012
- Neophisis siamensis Jin, 1992
