= Decma =

Scientific classification
- Domain: Eukaryota
- Kingdom: Animalia
- Phylum: Arthropoda
- Class: Insecta
- Order: Orthoptera
- Suborder: Ensifera
- Family: Tettigoniidae
- Subfamily: Meconematinae
- Tribe: Meconematini
- Genus: Decma; Gorochov, 1993

Genus of cricket-like animals

External image
- Image at iNaturalist

Decma is a genus of Asian bush crickets belonging to the tribe Meconematini: in the subfamily Meconematinae.

== Species ==
The Orthoptera Species File lists the following species, found in Indochina southern China and Malesia:

Subgenus Decma Gorochov, 1993

1. Decma bolivari (Karny, 1924)
2. Decma brachyptera Chang, Du & Shi, 2013
3. Decma fissa (Xia & Liu, 1992)
4. Decma inversa (Karny, 1907)
5. Decma lindu Gorochov, 2012
6. Decma minahassa Gorochov, 2012
7. Decma miramae Gorochov, 1993
8. Decma orlovi Gorochov, 2004
9. Decma predtetshenskyi Gorochov, 1993
10. Decma stshelkanovtzevi Gorochov, 1993 - type species, locality Đà Bắc District, Hoa Binh, Vietnam
11. Decma sulawesi Gorochov, 2012
12. Decma thai Gorochov, 1998
13. Decma tristis Gorochov & Kang, 2005

Subgenus Idiodecma Gorochov, 1993

1. Decma birmanica (Bey-Bienko, 1971)
2. Decma improvisum Gorochov & Kostia, 1993
3. Decma nigrovertex Liu, 2004

Subgenus Neodecma Gorochov, 2004

- Decma elefani Gorochov, 2004

Subgenus Paradecma Liu & Zhou, 2007

- Decma bispinosa Liu & Zhou, 2007

Subgenus not assigned

- Decma abruptum Gorochov, 2012
