= Zaxiphidiopsis =

Scientific classification
- Kingdom: Animalia
- Phylum: Arthropoda
- Clade: Pancrustacea
- Class: Insecta
- Order: Orthoptera
- Suborder: Ensifera
- Family: Tettigoniidae
- Subfamily: Meconematinae
- Tribe: Meconematini
- Genus: Zaxiphidiopsis; Gorochov, 1993

Synonyms
- Xiphidiopsis (Zaxiphidiopsis) Gorochov, 1993

Genus of true bugs

Zaxiphidiopsis is a monotypic genus of bush crickets in the tribe Meconematini, erected by Andrey Gorochov in 1995; the single species was elevated from subgenus Xiphidiopsis (Zaxiphidiopsis), to this new genus.

== Species ==
As of 2026 the species Zaxiphidiopsis bazyluki (Bey-Bienko, 1971), is the only species and found only in Vietnam; it was originally identified from Cúc Phương National Park: now in Ninh Bình province.
