= Grigoriora =

Scientific classification
- Domain: Eukaryota
- Kingdom: Animalia
- Phylum: Arthropoda
- Class: Insecta
- Order: Orthoptera
- Suborder: Ensifera
- Family: Tettigoniidae
- Subfamily: Meconematinae
- Tribe: Meconematini
- Genus: Grigoriora; Gorochov, 1993

Synonyms
- Satunia Sänger & Helfert, 1996

Genus of cricket-like animals

Grigoriora is a genus of Asian bush crickets belonging to the tribe Meconematini: in the subfamily Meconematinae.

== Species ==
The Orthoptera Species File lists the following species, found in Indo-China and China:

- Grigoriora alia Gorochov, 1998
- Grigoriora beybienkoi Gorochov, 1998
- Grigoriora breviuscula Gorochov, 1998
- Grigoriora cheni (Bey-Bienko, 1955)
- Grigoriora cryptocerca Liu, 2020
- Grigoriora dicata Gorochov, 1993 – type species (locality Gia Lai Province, Vietnam)
- Grigoriora kweichowensis (Tinkham, 1944)
- Grigoriora segregata Gorochov, 1998
- Grigoriora spinosa Gorochov, 1998
- Grigoriora tassirii (Sänger & Helfert, 1996)
