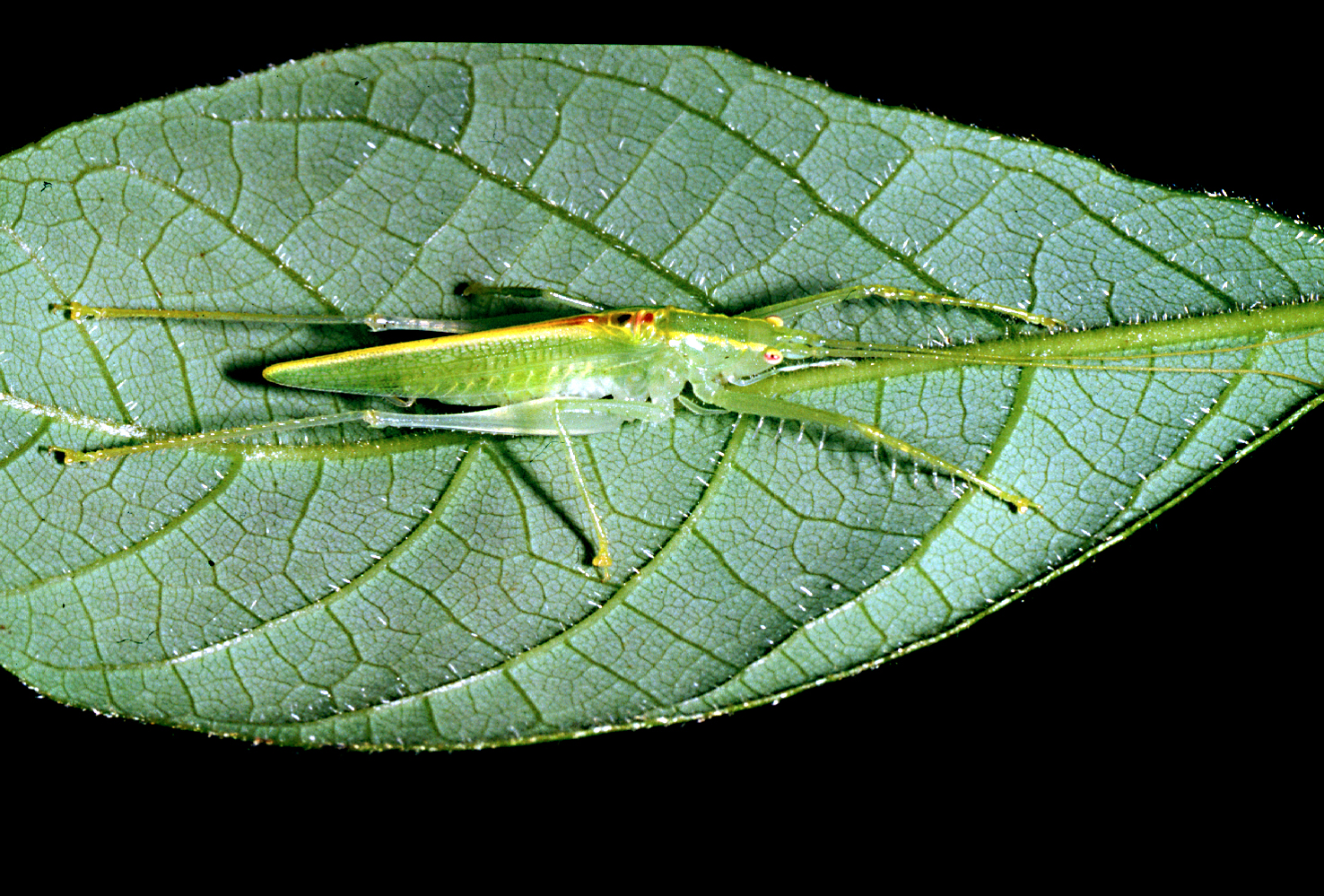
- Unknown Paraphisis species

Scientific classification
- Domain: Eukaryota
- Kingdom: Animalia
- Phylum: Arthropoda
- Class: Insecta
- Order: Orthoptera
- Suborder: Ensifera
- Superfamily: Tettigonioidea
- Family: Tettigoniidae
- Subfamily: Meconematinae
- Tribe: Phisidini
- Genus: Paraphisis; Karny, 1912

= Paraphisis =

Genus of cricket-like animals

Paraphisis is a genus of bush crickets in the subfamily Meconematinae.

Species in this genus are found in Australia and Papua New Guinea.

== Species ==
The Catalogue of Life lists the following:

- Paraphisis kurnkuni Rentz, 2001
- Paraphisis listeri Kirby, 1888
- Paraphisis lynae Rentz, 2001
- Paraphisis modla Rentz, 2001
- Paraphisis nurragi Rentz, 2001
- Paraphisis turnar Rentz, 2001
- Paraphisis wirreecoo Rentz, 2001
- Paraphisis wonnewarra Rentz, 2001
- Paraphisis acanthiola Jin, 1992
- Paraphisis acuminata Jin, 1992
- Paraphisis arfakensis Jin, 1992
- Paraphisis helleri Karny, 1912 - type species
- Paraphisis lingulata Jin, 1992
- Paraphisis longipennis Kästner, 1933
- Paraphisis longipygida Jin, 1992
- Paraphisis noonadanae Kevan, 1992
- Paraphisis pachycercat] Jin, 1992
- Paraphisis proxima Jin, 1992
- Paraphisis rubrosignata Bolívar, 1905
- Paraphisis spinicercis Jin, Kevan & Hsu, 1991
- Paraphisis trigonata Jin, 1992
- Paraphisis tropida Jin, 1992
- Paraphisis truncata Jin, 1992
- Paraphisis alumba Rentz, 2001
- Paraphisis chopardi Jin, Kevan & Hsu, 1991
- Paraphisis leawillia Rentz, 2001
- Paraphisis tryonensis Jin, 1992
- Paraphisis turnar Rentz, D.C.F., 2001
- Paraphisis wirreecoo Rentz, D.C.F., 2001
- Paraphisis wonnewarra Rentz, D.C.F., 2001
