= Cononicephora =

Scientific classification
- Domain: Eukaryota
- Kingdom: Animalia
- Phylum: Arthropoda
- Class: Insecta
- Order: Orthoptera
- Suborder: Ensifera
- Family: Tettigoniidae
- Subfamily: Meconematinae
- Tribe: Meconematini
- Genus: Cononicephora; Gorochov, 1993

Type species
- Coniocephora tarbinskyi Gorochov, 1993

Genus of cricket-like animals

Cononicephora is a genus of Asian bush crickets belonging to the tribe Meconematini within the subfamily Meconematinae. All species are endemic to Vietnam.

== Species ==
As of 2022, Orthoptera Species File lists two subgenera:

Cononicephora (Acononicephora) Gorochov, 1994

1. Cononicephora rentzi Gorochov, 1994 - Tram Lap, Gia Lai Province

Cononicephora (Cononicephora) Gorochov, 1993

1. Cononicephora acutilobata Wang, 2020 - Lang Bian mountain
2. Cononicephora berezhkovi Gorochov, 1993 - Ba Vi National Park
3. Cononicephora tarbinskyi Gorochov, 1993 – type species (from Vĩnh Phúc Province, Vietnam)
