= Rhinoteratura =

Scientific classification
- Domain: Eukaryota
- Kingdom: Animalia
- Phylum: Arthropoda
- Class: Insecta
- Order: Orthoptera
- Suborder: Ensifera
- Family: Tettigoniidae
- Subfamily: Meconematinae
- Tribe: Meconematini
- Genus: Rhinoteratura; Gorochov, 1993

Synonyms
- Leptoteratura (Rhinoteratura) Gorochov, 1993

Genus of cricket-like animals

Rhinoteratura is a genus of Asian bush crickets belonging to the tribe Meconematini in the new subtribe Meconematina. The genus was erected by AV Gorochov in 1993 as a subgenus of Leptoteratura (Rhinoteratura); he uprated it to genus level in 2022. Species are recorded from Japan, China (including Taiwan), Vietnam, and west Malesia (but this may be incomplete).

== Species ==
The Orthoptera Species File lists the following:

1. Rhinoteratura capreola (Redtenbacher, 1891)
2. Rhinoteratura chaseni (Karny, 1926) (synonym Leptoteratura borneoensis (Jin, 1995))
3. Rhinoteratura chela (Tan, Gorochov & Wahab, 2017)
4. Rhinoteratura kailingensis (Jin, 2020)
5. Rhinoteratura ketambe Gorochov, 2022
6. Rhinoteratura lamellata (Mao & Shi, 2007)
7. Rhinoteratura pseudocapreola Gorochov, 2022
8. Rhinoteratura pulchra (Gorochov, 2008)
9. Rhinoteratura raoani (Gorochov, 2008)
10. Rhinoteratura sakaii (Jin, 2020)
11. Rhinoteratura sharovi (Gorochov, 1993)
  - type species (as Leptoteratura sharovi Gorochov) locality: near Tam Dao, Vinh Phu Province, Vietnam
12. Rhinoteratura symmetrica (Yamasaki, 1988)
13. Rhinoteratura uniformis (Gorochov, 2008)
