= Acilacris nigroornatus =

Conservation status
- Critically Endangered (IUCN 3.1)

Scientific classification
- Kingdom: Animalia
- Phylum: Arthropoda
- Clade: Pancrustacea
- Class: Insecta
- Order: Orthoptera
- Suborder: Ensifera
- Family: Tettigoniidae
- Genus: Acilacris
- Subgenus: Aroegas
- Species: A. nigroornatus

Binomial name
- Acilacris nigroornatus (Péringuey, 1916)

Synonyms
- Aroegas nigroornatus Péringuey, 1916

Species of cricket-like animal

Acilacris nigroornatus, the black-spotted false shieldback, is a species of katydid that is only known from the male holotype collected from Mpumalanga, South Africa. It is threatened by livestock grazing and changing weather patterns disturbing its microhabitat.
