= Marakele delicate katydid =

Conservation status
- Vulnerable (IUCN 3.1)

Scientific classification
- Domain: Eukaryota
- Kingdom: Animalia
- Phylum: Arthropoda
- Class: Insecta
- Order: Orthoptera
- Suborder: Ensifera
- Family: Tettigoniidae
- Subfamily: Meconematinae
- Tribe: Meconematini
- Genus: Naskreckia
- Species: N. marakelensis

Binomial name
- Naskreckia marakelensis (Naskrecki, Bazelet & Spearman, 2008)

Synonyms
- Amyttacta marakelensis Naskrecki, Bazelet & Spearman, 2008

Species of cricket-like animal

The Marakele delicate katydid (Naskreckia marakelensis) is a species of bush cricket or katydid orthopteran that is endemic to Marakele National Park in Limpopo Province, South Africa. It can be found within savanna and grassland biomes, and feeds on flowers and grass seeds, particularly Guinea grass. Because of its limited distribution, the IUCN considers it to be vulnerable to extinction, and is threatened by microclimatic changes.
