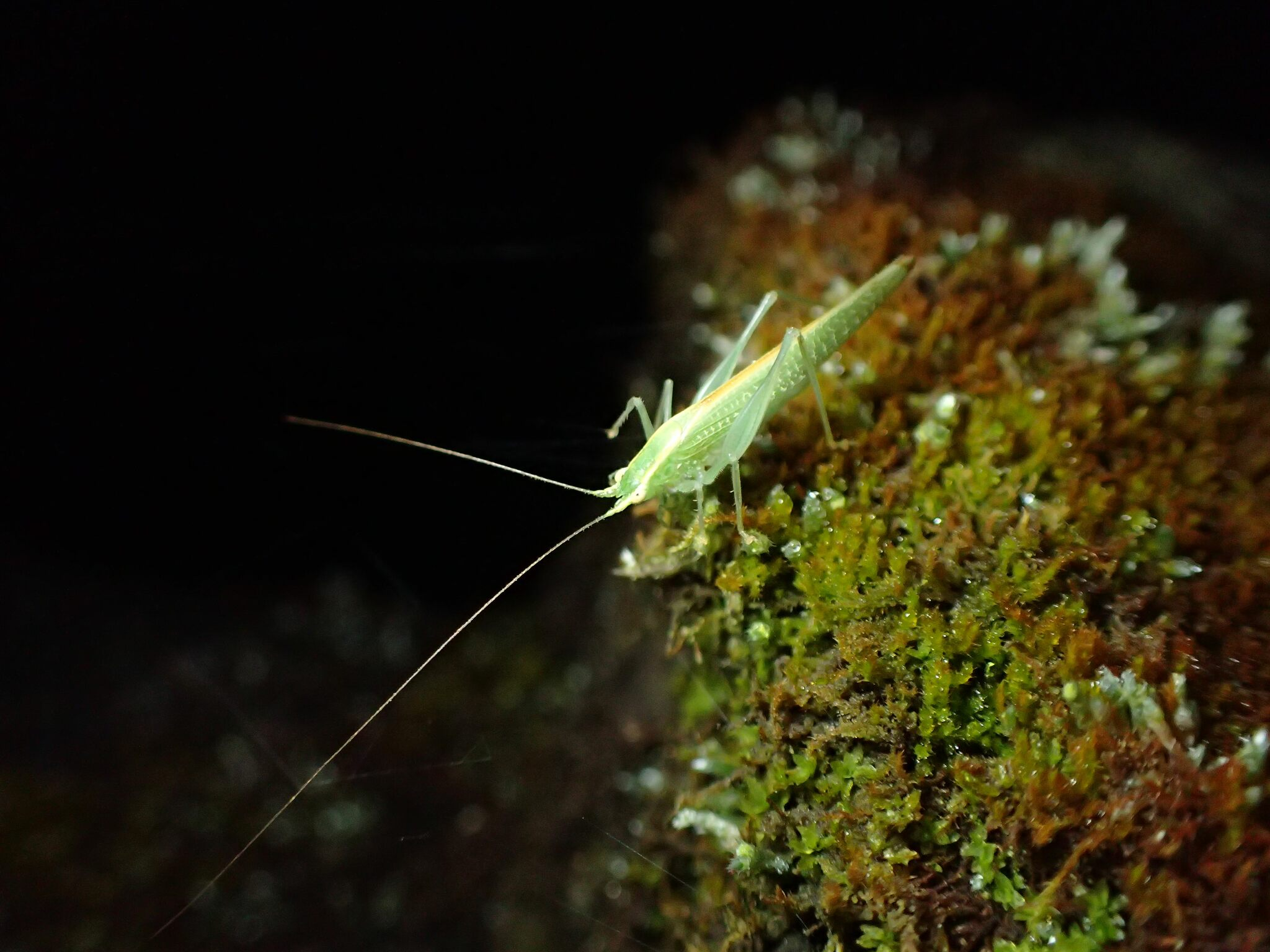
- Leptoteratura albicorne

Scientific classification
- Domain: Eukaryota
- Kingdom: Animalia
- Phylum: Arthropoda
- Class: Insecta
- Order: Orthoptera
- Suborder: Ensifera
- Family: Tettigoniidae
- Subfamily: Meconematinae
- Tribe: Meconematini
- Genus: Leptoteratura; Yamasaki, 1982

= Leptoteratura =

Genus of cricket-like animals

External image
- Images at iNaturalist

Leptoteratura is a genus of Asian bush crickets belonging to the tribe Meconematini in the subfamily Meconematinae. They are found in China, Japan, Malaysia, Taiwan, and Vietnam.

== Species ==
The Orthoptera Species File lists the following species:

1. Leptoteratura albicornis (Motschulsky, 1866)
  – type species (as Meconema albicorne Motschulsky)
2. Leptoteratura cemande Gorochov, 2008
3. Leptoteratura digitata Yamasaki, 1987
4. Leptoteratura emarginata Liu, 2004
5. Leptoteratura gialai Gorochov, 2008
6. Leptoteratura jona Yamasaki, 1987
7. Leptoteratura kevani Gorochov, 1998
8. Leptoteratura koncharangi Gorochov, 1998
9. Leptoteratura martynovi Gorochov, 1998
10. Leptoteratura sugonjaevi Gorochov, 1994
11. Leptoteratura taiwana Yamasaki, 1987
12. Leptoteratura triura Liu, 1997
13. Leptoteratura yaeyamana Yamasaki, 1987 (2 subspecies)

Note: before 2022, the genus Rhinoteratura was placed here as the subgenus Leptoteratura (Rhinoteratura).
