= Supersonus =

- Supersonus aequoreus male in Colombia

Scientific classification
- Kingdom: Animalia
- Phylum: Arthropoda
- Class: Insecta
- Order: Orthoptera
- Suborder: Ensifera
- Family: Tettigoniidae
- Tribe: Phisidini
- Genus: Supersonus; Sarria-S. et al, 2014

Species
- Supersonus aequoreus; Supersonus piercei; Supersonus undulus

Genus of katydids

High-speed video recording of Supersonus aequoreus during sound production.

Supersonus piercei female in Colombia

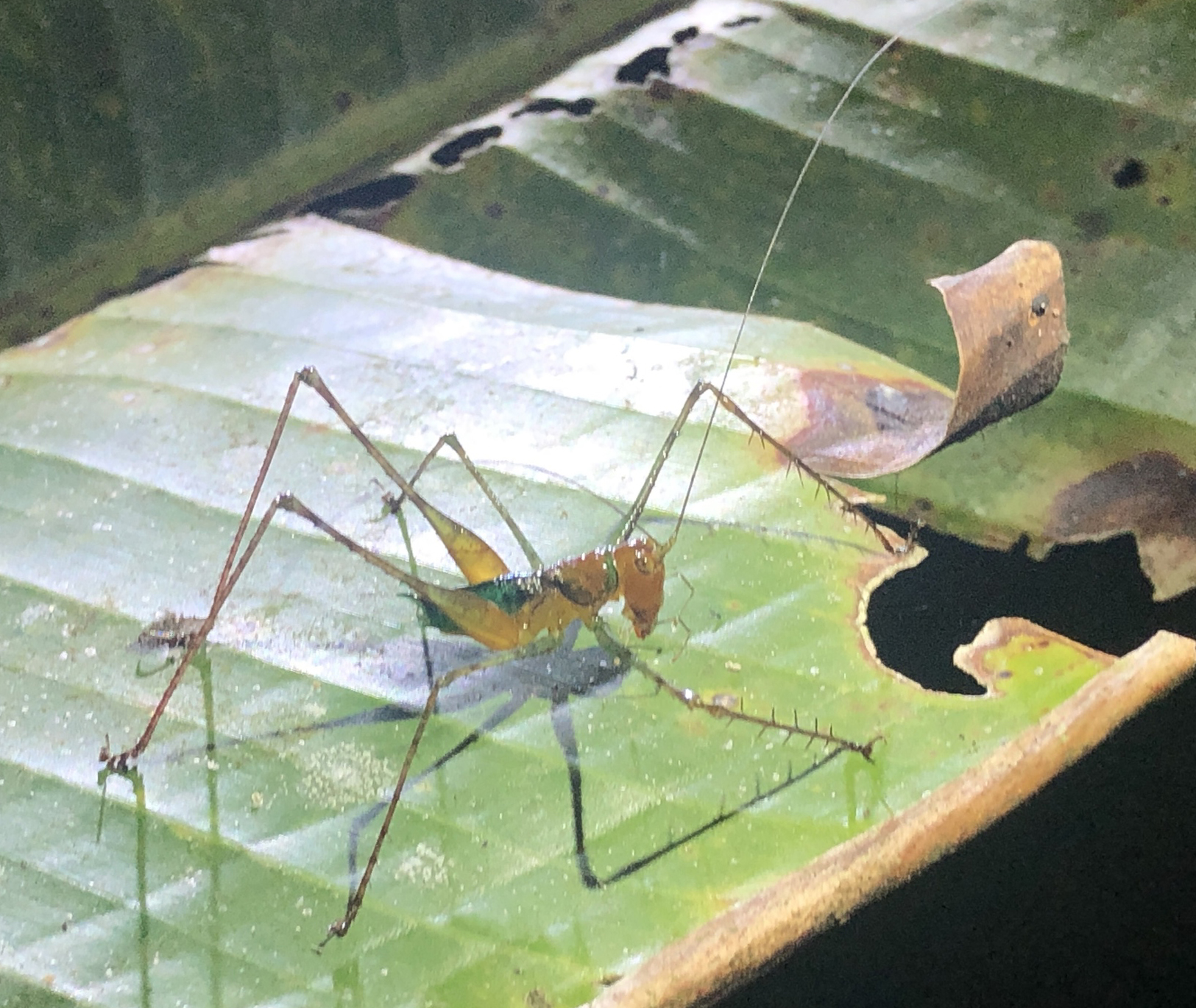
Supersonus sp. male in Ecuador

Supersonus is a genus of katydids in the order Orthoptera first described in 2014. The genus contains three species which are endemic to the rainforests of South America. Its name is an allusion to the fact that the males, in order to attract the females, produce a very high frequency noise which can reach 150 kHz (using only the right wing). This has been considered the highest frequency ultrasonic noise of the animal kingdom. The noise is imperceptible to human hearing, which is only capable of detecting up to 20 kHz.

== Habitat ==
Supersonus species inhabit tropical to lowland rainforest environments at heights between 10 and 15 m (33 and 49 ft) above the forest floor, often a few meters below the forest canopy. They live on and among the epiphytal growth such as bromeliads and orchids on tree trunks and limbs.

Populations of Supersonus aequoreus are known on the islands of Gorgona and Gorgonilla in the National Natural Park (PNN) Gorgona, which are isolated 35 km (22 mi) off the mainland Colombian coast. The rainforest of the islands is similar to that of the mainland, with an average annual temperature of 26 °C (79 °F) and rainfall averaging 6,891 mm (271.3 in).

The Supersonus piercei population is known from Watershed Pericos around the small community of El Salto, in the Valle del Cauca Department of mainland Colombia. Like the rainforest of National Natural Park (PNN) Gorgona, the Watershed Pericos forest is a lowland tropical rainforest though is location on the western edges of the Andean Cordillera result in more rainfall and temperature fluctuation. Rainfall amounts in the watershed range between 4,000 and 10,000 mm (160 and 390 in) and the temperature range is between 18 and 25 °C (64 and 77 °F) annually.

The population of Supersonus undulus inhabits a lowland rainforest environment at Tinalandia, in a private forest preserve between Quito and Santo Domingo de los Colorado in Pichincha Province. The elevation of the rainforest is 600 m (2,000 ft), the highest of the three population habitats, with a forest typical of the western Andean slopes.

== Taxonomy ==
Early specimens belonging to Supersonus were misidentified by researchers as specimens in the genus Arachnoscelis, with early specimen records dating back to 1927. Redescription of the Arachnoscelis type species by Montealegre-Z et al. (2013) highlighted the notable differences between the type species and a number of specimens tentatively identified to that genus.

The genus Supersonus was first described by Sarria-S et al (2014) based on specimens collected from locations in Colombia and Ecuador. Efforts to collect specimens were first collected during night expeditions in which researches manually searched the rainforest undergrowth wearing headlamps. However, over a span of almost 15 years, very few specimens were recovered. Discovery of the adults' preferred living height allowed the entomologists to collect a much larger sample group.

Sarria-S et al (2014) chose the genus name Supersonus as a combination of the Latin words "super" meaning "above" and "sonus" meaning "sound". The name is recognition of the high forest perches used by calling males of the genus, along with the calls ranging above 100 kHz, and in honor of the original designation for ultrasonic frequencies as "supersonic". Along with the genus description, three species were described in the 2014 type paper, Supersonus aequoreus, Supersonus piercei, and Supersonus undulus. Initially the genus was placed into the Tettigoniidae subfamily Listroscelidinae and considered close in relationship to Arachnoscelis; however, further work led to a placement in the Meconematinae tribe Phisidini.

== Acoustics ==
At the time of description, the communication calls of male Supersonus species were identified as the highest frequency known from an arthropod, with calls reaching 115 kHz, 125 kHz, and 150 kHz in the three species. The typical frequency range for male katydid calls is between 5 kHz and 30 kHz, mostly within the human hearing range of 50 Hz to 20 kHz. The mating call of male S. aequoreus is the highest ultrasound calling carrier recorded in nature with a top frequency of 150 kHz. The calls are generated by the modified right forewings which form a cavity over the insect dorsum producing sharp resonances and elevated sound pressure levels for the calling.
