= Pseudothaumaspis =

Scientific classification
- Domain: Eukaryota
- Kingdom: Animalia
- Phylum: Arthropoda
- Class: Insecta
- Order: Orthoptera
- Suborder: Ensifera
- Family: Tettigoniidae
- Subfamily: Meconematinae
- Tribe: Meconematini
- Genus: Pseudothaumaspis; Gorochov, 1998

Genus of cricket-like animals

Pseudothaumaspis is a genus of Asian bush crickets belonging to the tribe Meconematini: in the subfamily Meconematinae. AV Gorochov originally placed these species as a subgenus of Thaumaspis.

== Species ==
The Orthoptera Species File lists the following species, found in eastern China and Viet Nam:

1. Pseudothaumaspis bispinosus Wang & Liu, 2014
2. Pseudothaumaspis furcocercus Wang & Liu, 2014
3. Pseudothaumaspis gialaiensis (Gorochov, 1998) – type species (locality: near Buon Luoi village, Gia Lai, Vietnam)
