= Thaumaspis =

Scientific classification
- Kingdom: Animalia
- Phylum: Arthropoda
- Clade: Pancrustacea
- Class: Insecta
- Order: Orthoptera
- Suborder: Ensifera
- Family: Tettigoniidae
- Tribe: Meconematini
- Genus: Thaumaspis; Bolívar, 1900

Type species
- Thaumaspis trigonurus Bolívar, 1900

Genus of cricket-like animals

Thaumaspis is a genus of Asian bush crickets belonging to the tribe Meconematini in the subfamily Meconematinae. The known distribution is from India, southern China, and Malesia (Java), but records are probably incomplete.

== Species ==
The Orthoptera Species File lists the following subgenera and species:

Subgenus Isothaumaspis Gorochov, 1993

1. Thaumaspis forcipatus Bolívar, 1900

Subgenus Thaumaspis Bolívar, 1900

1. Thaumaspis castetsi Gorochov, 1993
2. Thaumaspis henanensis Liu & Wang, 1998
3. Thaumaspis longipes Bolívar, 1900
4. Thaumaspis montanus Bey-Bienko, 1957
5. Thaumaspis siccifolii (Karny, 1922)
6. Thaumaspis trigonurus Bolívar, 1900 – type species (locality: Tamil Nadu, India)

The genus Pseudothaumaspis, previously placed here as a subgenus of Thaumaspis, is now considered a separate genus. Other species transferred to other genera include Athaumaspis bifurcatus.
