= Nicephora =

Scientific classification
- Kingdom: Animalia
- Phylum: Arthropoda
- Class: Insecta
- Order: Orthoptera
- Suborder: Ensifera
- Family: Tettigoniidae
- Subfamily: Meconematinae
- Tribe: Meconematini
- Genus: Nicephora; Bolívar, 1900

Genus of cricket-like animals

Nicephora is a genus of Asian bush crickets belonging to the tribe Meconematini in the subfamily Meconematinae. They are found in India, Sri Lanka, southern China, and Vietnam.

== Species ==
The Orthoptera Species File lists the following species,

Subgenus Dianicephora

Auth. Gorochov, 1993 - Indian subcontinent

- Nicephora mirabilis Bolívar, 1900

Subgenus Eunicephora

Auth. Gorochov, 1998

- Nicephora dianxiensis Wang & Liu, 2013 - southern China
- Nicephora ulla Gorochov, 1998 - Vietnam

Subgenus Nicephora

Auth. Bolívar, 1900 - Indian subcontinent

- Nicephora forficulata Carl, 1921
- Nicephora hakgallae Henry, 1932
- Nicephora mazerani Bolívar, 1900
- Nicephora subulata Bolívar, 1900
- Nicephora trigonidioides Bolívar, 1900 – type species
