= Canariola =

Scientific classification
- Domain: Eukaryota
- Kingdom: Animalia
- Phylum: Arthropoda
- Class: Insecta
- Order: Orthoptera
- Suborder: Ensifera
- Family: Tettigoniidae
- Subfamily: Meconematinae
- Tribe: Meconematini
- Genus: Canariola; Uvarov, 1940

Synonyms
- Orophila Krauss, 1892

Genus of cricket-like animals

External image
- Image at iNaturalist

Canariola is a genus of European bush crickets belonging to the tribe Meconematini (no subtribe assigned) erected by Boris Uvarov in 1940. Species have been found in the Canary Islands and the Iberian Peninsula.

== Species ==
The Orthoptera Species File lists the following:

1. Canariola emarginata Newman, 1964 (2 subspecies)
2. Canariola nubigena (Krauss, 1892) - type species (as Orophila nubigena Krauss)
3. Canariola quinonesi Llucià Pomares & Iñiguez Yarza, 2010
4. Canariola willemsei Morales-Agacino, 1959 (the "Tenerife Laurel Bush-Cricket")
