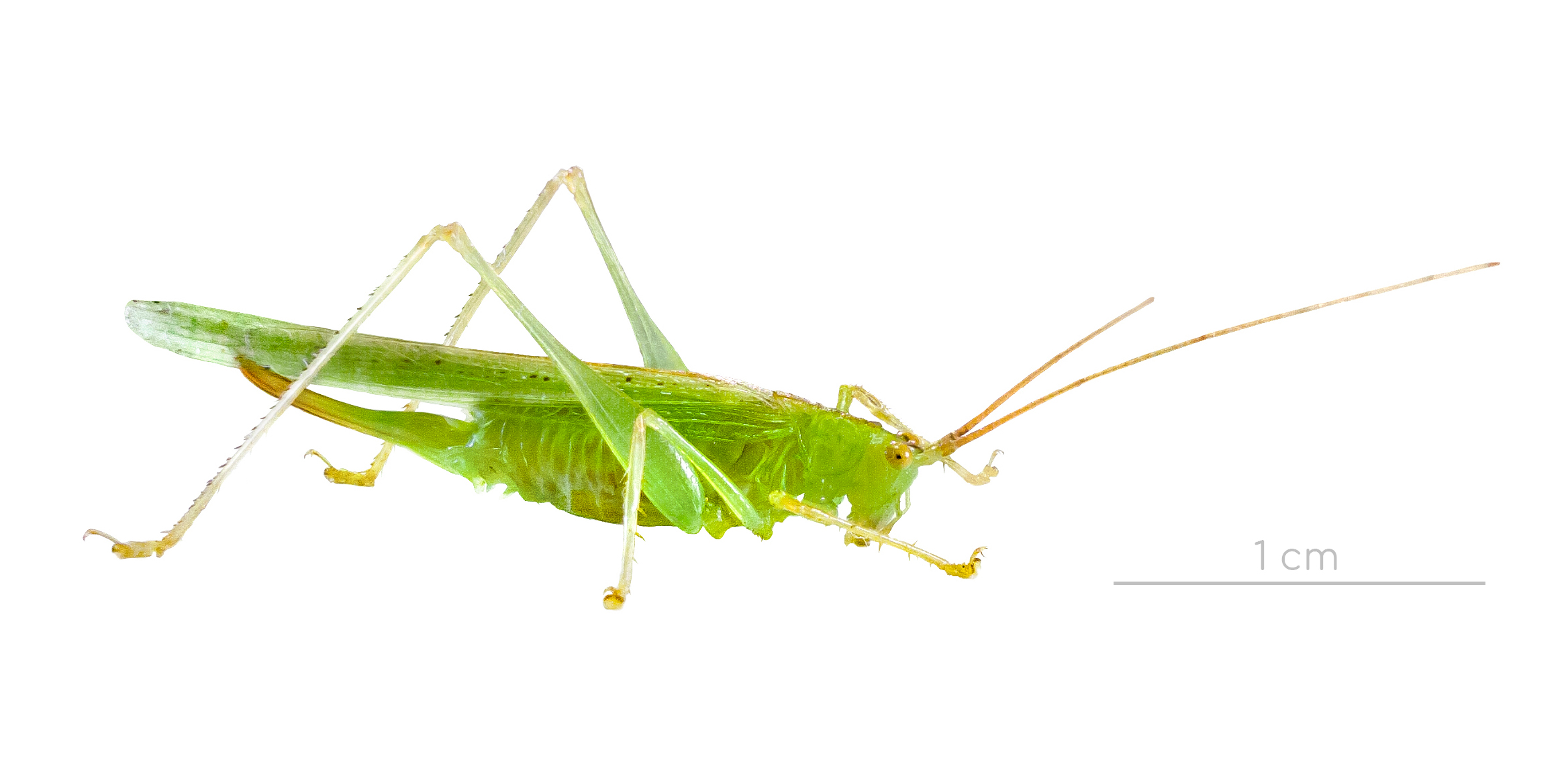
- Female Kuzicus suzukii

Scientific classification
- Domain: Eukaryota
- Kingdom: Animalia
- Phylum: Arthropoda
- Class: Insecta
- Order: Orthoptera
- Suborder: Ensifera
- Family: Tettigoniidae
- Subfamily: Meconematinae
- Tribe: Meconematini
- Genus: Kuzicus; Gorochov, 1993

= Kuzicus =

Genus of cricket-like animals

Kuzicus is a genus of Asian bush crickets belonging to the tribe Meconematini in the subfamily Meconematinae.

== Species ==
The Orthoptera Species File lists the following species, found in India, Indo-China, southern China, Taiwan, Korea, Japan and Malesia:

Subgenus Kuzicus Gorochov, 1993

1. Kuzicus aspercaudatus Sänger & Helfert, 2006
2. Kuzicus bicornis Ingrisch, 2006
3. Kuzicus bicurvus Cui & Shi, 2019
4. Kuzicus cervicercus (Tinkham, 1943)
5. Kuzicus compressus Han & Shi, 2014
6. Kuzicus denticulatus (Karny, 1926)
7. Kuzicus denticuloides (Kevan & Jin, 1993)
8. Kuzicus koeppeli Sänger & Helfert, 2004
9. Kuzicus leptocercus Zhu & Shi, 2017
10. Kuzicus megaterminatus Ingrisch & Shishodia, 1998
11. Kuzicus mirabilis Tan & Wahab, 2018
12. Kuzicus mirus Gorochov, 2016
13. Kuzicus multidenticulatus Tan, Dawwrueng & Artchawakom, 2015
14. Kuzicus multifidous Mao & Shi, 2009
15. Kuzicus pakthongchai Tan, Dawwrueng & Artchawakom, 2015
16. Kuzicus scorpioides Sänger & Helfert, 2006
17. Kuzicus suzukii (Matsumura & Shiraki, 1908) – type species (as Teratura suzukii Matsumura, locality Kyoto Japan)

Subgenus Neokuzicus Gorochov, 1993

1. Kuzicus inflatus (Shi & Zheng, 1995)
2. Kuzicus sarawakicus Liu, 2020
3. Kuzicus uvarovi Gorochov, 1993
