= Kristin's false shieldback =

Conservation status
- Critically Endangered (IUCN 3.1)

Scientific classification
- Domain: Eukaryota
- Kingdom: Animalia
- Phylum: Arthropoda
- Class: Insecta
- Order: Orthoptera
- Suborder: Ensifera
- Family: Tettigoniidae
- Genus: Acilacris
- Subgenus: Acilacris
- Species: A. kristinae

Binomial name
- Acilacris kristinae Naskrecki, 1996

Species of cricket-like animal

Kristin's false shieldback (Acilacris kristinae) is a tettigoniid orthopteran that is endemic to two localities within Malta Forest in Limpopo, South Africa. It is threatened by deforestation and changes in its microclimate. It is a diurnal insect, and has a daily rhythm. It has a hemimetabolous metamorphosis which results in no pupal stage. It is a predator and feeds on aphids.
