= Richtersveld katydid =

Conservation status
- Vulnerable (IUCN 3.1)

Scientific classification
- Domain: Eukaryota
- Kingdom: Animalia
- Phylum: Arthropoda
- Class: Insecta
- Order: Orthoptera
- Suborder: Ensifera
- Family: Tettigoniidae
- Subfamily: Meconematinae
- Tribe: Meconematini
- Subtribe: Acilacridina
- Genus: Africariola
- Species: A. longicauda

Binomial name
- Africariola longicauda Naskrecki, 1996

Species of cricket-like animal

The Richtersveld katydid (Africariola longicauda) is a species of katydid that is endemic to the Richtersveld National Park in South Africa. It occurs in semi-arid habitats of the Karoo biotope. It is threatened by livestock grazing and climate change.
