= Xizicus =

Scientific classification
- Domain: Eukaryota
- Kingdom: Animalia
- Phylum: Arthropoda
- Class: Insecta
- Order: Orthoptera
- Suborder: Ensifera
- Family: Tettigoniidae
- Subfamily: Meconematinae
- Tribe: Meconematini
- Genus: Xizicus; Gorochov, 1993

Type species
- Xizicus fascipes (Bey-Bienko, 1955)

Genus of cricket-like animals

External image
- Images at iNaturalist

Xizicus is a genus of Asian bush crickets belonging to the tribe Meconematini in the subfamily Meconematinae. They are found in India, China, Korea, and Indochina.

== Subgenera and species ==
The Orthoptera Species File currently lists the following species (Eoxizicus may be placed here or at the genus level):

subgenus Axizicus Gorochov, 1998

1. Xizicus andamanensis (Kevan & Jin, 1993)
2. Xizicus appendiculatus (Tinkham, 1944)
3. Xizicus bifurcatus Liu, 2020
4. Xizicus bispinus Jiao & Shi, 2014
5. Xizicus falcata Chang, Du & Shi, 2013
6. Xizicus furcus (Cui, Liu & Shi, 2020)
7. Xizicus lineosus Gorochov & Kang, 2005
8. Xizicus sergeji (Gorochov, 1998)
9. Xizicus spinocercus Jiao & Shi, 2013

Subgenus Furcixizicus Gorochov, 2002

1. Xizicus bilobus (Bey-Bienko, 1962)
2. Xizicus changi Gorochov, 2002
3. Xizicus cryptostictus (Hebard, 1922)
4. Xizicus furcicercus Gorochov, 2002
5. Xizicus omelkoi Gorochov, 2019
6. Xizicus siamensis (Karny, 1926)

Subgenus Haploxizicus Wang, Jing, Liu & Li, 2014

1. Xizicus hunanensis (Xia & Liu, 1992)
2. Xizicus incisus (Xia & Liu, 1990)
3. Xizicus maculatus (Xia & Liu, 1992)
4. Xizicus spathulatus (Tinkham, 1944)
5. Xizicus szechwanensis (Tinkham, 1944)

Subgenus Paraxizicus Liu, 2004

1. Xizicus anisocercus Liu, 2004
2. Xizicus biprocerus (Shi & Zheng, 1996)
3. Xizicus fallax Wang, Jing, Liu & Li, 2014
4. Xizicus furcistylus Feng, Chang & Shi, 2016

Subgenus Xizicus Gorochov, 1993

1. Xizicus daedalus Gorochov, 2011
2. Xizicus fascipes (Bey-Bienko, 1955) – type species
3. Xizicus juxtafurcus (Xia & Liu, 1990)
4. Xizicus proximus Gorochov, 1998
5. Xizicus spinicaudus (Sänger & Helfert, 1998)
6. Xizicus tricercus Feng, Shi & Mao, 2017

Subgenus Zangxizicus Wang, Jing, Liu & Li, 2014

1. Xizicus curvus Chang & Shi, 2016
2. Xizicus quadrifascipes Wang, Jing, Liu & Li, 2014
3. Xizicus tibeticus Wang, Jing, Liu & Li, 2014

Not placed in a subgenus

1. Xizicus kaltenbachi Sänger & Helfert, 2006
