= Acilacris fuscus =

Conservation status
- Endangered (IUCN 3.1)

Scientific classification
- Kingdom: Animalia
- Phylum: Arthropoda
- Clade: Pancrustacea
- Class: Insecta
- Order: Orthoptera
- Suborder: Ensifera
- Family: Tettigoniidae
- Genus: Acilacris
- Subgenus: Aroegas
- Species: A. fuscus

Binomial name
- Acilacris fuscus (Naskrecki, 1996)

Synonyms
- Aroegas fuscus Naskrecki, 1996

Species of cricket-like animal

Acilacris fuscus, the brown false shieldback, is a species of katydid that is only known from two localities; in Mpumalanga and in Limpopo provinces, South Africa. It only occurs at elevations above 1,200 m in the mesic highveld grasslands.
