= Phlugiolopsis =

Scientific classification
- Domain: Eukaryota
- Kingdom: Animalia
- Phylum: Arthropoda
- Class: Insecta
- Order: Orthoptera
- Suborder: Ensifera
- Family: Tettigoniidae
- Subfamily: Meconematinae
- Tribe: Meconematini
- Genus: Phlugiolopsis; Zeuner, 1940

Synonyms
- Acyrtaspis Bey-Bienko, 1955

Genus of cricket-like animals

Phlugiolopsis is a genus of Asian bush crickets belonging to the tribe Meconematini in the subfamily Meconematinae. They are found in Indochina, China and Sumatra.

== Species ==
The Orthoptera Species File lists the following species, that may be placed in four subgenera:

subgenus Longiloba Bian, Shi & Chang, 2018

Distribution: China

1. Phlugiolopsis bispinata Bian & Shi, 2018
2. Phlugiolopsis complanispinis Bian, Shi & Chang, 2013
3. Phlugiolopsis emarginata Bian, Shi & Chang, 2013
4. Phlugiolopsis montana Wang, Li & Liu, 2012
5. Phlugiolopsis pentagonis Bian, Shi & Chang, 2013

subgenus Omkoiana Sänger & Helfert, 2002

Distribution: China, Indochina, Sumatra

1. Phlugiolopsis aculeata (Sänger & Helfert, 2002)
2. Phlugiolopsis bilobulata Gorochov, 2020
3. Phlugiolopsis brevis Xia & Liu, 1993
4. Phlugiolopsis chayuensis Wang, Li & Liu, 2012
5. Phlugiolopsis damingshanis Bian, Shi & Chang, 2012
6. Phlugiolopsis digitusis Bian, Shi & Chang, 2012
7. Phlugiolopsis huangi Bian, Shi & Chang, 2012
8. Phlugiolopsis longiangulis Bian, Shi & Chang, 2013
9. Phlugiolopsis longicerca Wang, Li & Liu, 2012
10. Phlugiolopsis minuta (Tinkham, 1943)
11. Phlugiolopsis pectinis Bian, Shi & Chang, 2012
12. Phlugiolopsis trilobulata Gorochov, 2020
13. Phlugiolopsis trullis Bian, Shi & Chang, 2012
14. Phlugiolopsis tuberculata Xia & Liu, 1993
15. Phlugiolopsis uncicercis Bian, Shi & Chang, 2013
16. Phlugiolopsis ventralis Wang, Li & Liu, 2012
17. Phlugiolopsis vietnamica Wang, Li & Liu, 2012
18. Phlugiolopsis xinanensis Bian, Shi & Chang, 2013

subgenus Phlugiolopsis Zeuner, 1940

Distribution: China, Taiwan

1. Phlugiolopsis carinata Wang, Li & Liu, 2012
2. Phlugiolopsis grahami (Tinkham, 1944)
3. Phlugiolopsis henryi Zeuner, 1940 - type species
4. Phlugiolopsis taiwanensis Wang, Chen & Shi, 2019
5. Phlugiolopsis yaeyamensis Yamasaki, 1986

subgenus Tribranchis Bian & Shi, 2018

Distribution: China

1. Phlugiolopsis circolobosis Bian, Shi & Chang, 2013
2. Phlugiolopsis elongata Bian, Shi & Chang, 2013
3. Phlugiolopsis punctata Wang, Li & Liu, 2012
4. Phlugiolopsis tribranchis Bian, Shi & Chang, 2012

subgenus Uncinata Bian & Shi, 2018

Distribution: China, Vietnam

1. Phlugiolopsis adentis Bian, Shi & Chang, 2012
2. Phlugiolopsis angustimarginis Bian & Shi, 2018
3. Phlugiolopsis latusiprocera Bian & Shi, 2018
4. Phlugiolopsis mistshenkoi (Gorochov, 1993)
5. Phlugiolopsis platylobosis Bian & Shi, 2018
6. Phlugiolopsis yunnanensis Shi & Ou, 2005
