= Neocononicephora =

Scientific classification
- Domain: Eukaryota
- Kingdom: Animalia
- Phylum: Arthropoda
- Class: Insecta
- Order: Orthoptera
- Suborder: Ensifera
- Family: Tettigoniidae
- Subfamily: Meconematinae
- Tribe: Meconematini
- Genus: Neocononicephora; Gorochov, 1998

Genus of cricket-like animals

Neocononicephora is a genus of Asian bush crickets, belonging to the tribe Meconematini of the subfamily Meconematinae. Three species have been found to date (2020): all from Vietnam.

== Species ==
The Orthoptera Species File lists:

- Neocononicephora fyanensis Wang, 2020
- Neocononicephora sinuosa Wang, 2020
- Neocononicephora storozhenkoi (Gorochov, 1994) - type species (as Cononicephora storozhenkoi Gorochov), locality Gia Lai, Vietnam
