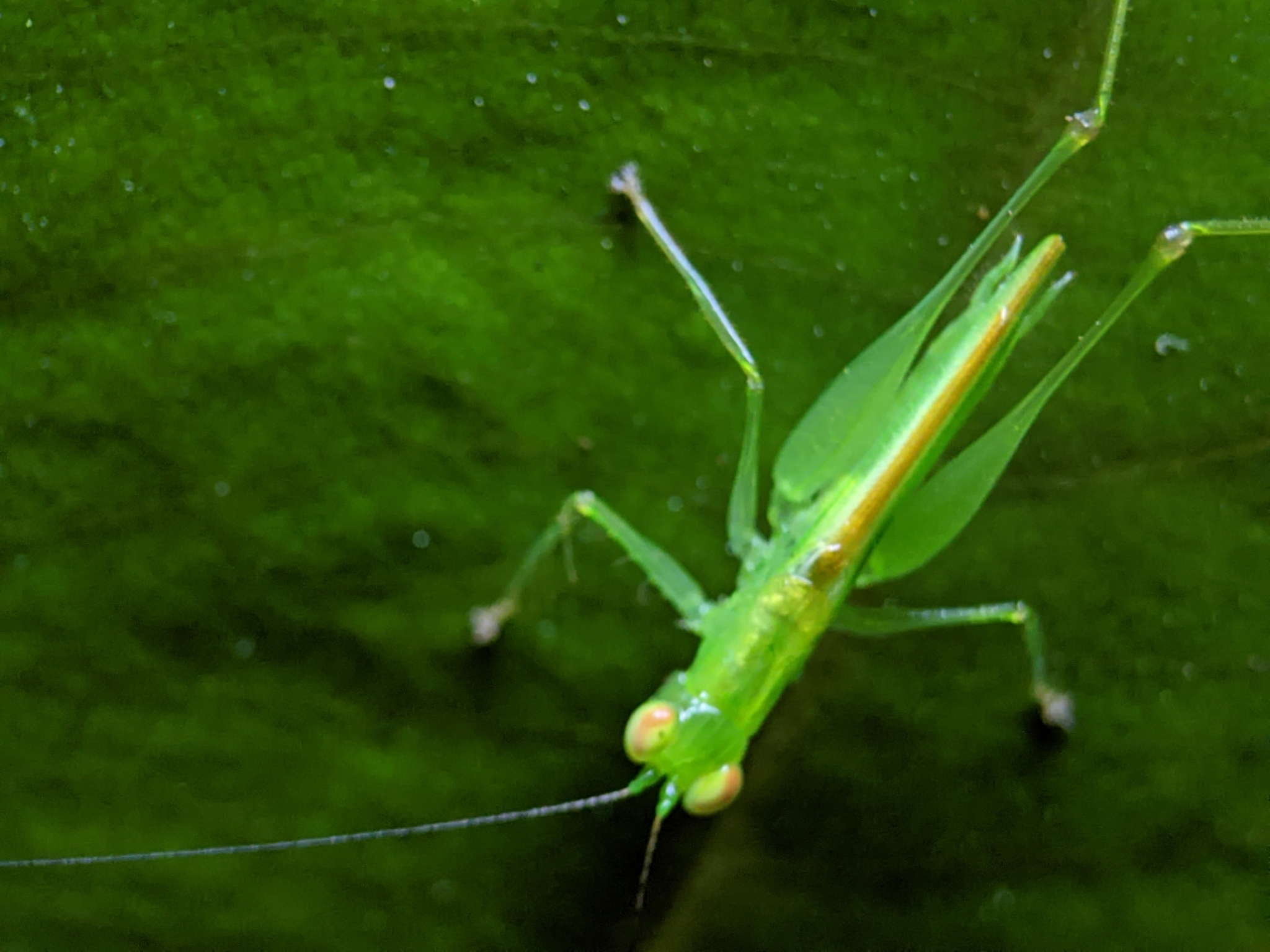
- Asiophlugis thaumasia

Scientific classification
- Domain: Eukaryota
- Kingdom: Animalia
- Phylum: Arthropoda
- Class: Insecta
- Order: Orthoptera
- Suborder: Ensifera
- Family: Tettigoniidae
- Subfamily: Meconematinae
- Tribe: Phlugidini
- Genus: Asiophlugis; Gorochov, 1998

= Asiophlugis =

Genus of cricket-like animals

Asiophlugis is a genus of Asian bush crickets belonging to the tribe Phlugidini, of the subfamily Meconematinae.

The known distribution of Asiophlugis is Malesia (including Sulawesi and the Philippines) and Indo-China (but there are no Vietnam records).

== Species ==
The Orthoptera Species File lists:

- Asiophlugis bintulu Gorochov, 2019
- Asiophlugis borneoensis (Jin, 1993)
- Asiophlugis cercalis Gorochov, 2012
- Asiophlugis dubia (Karny, 1907)
- Asiophlugis kubah Gorochov, 2012
- Asiophlugis legitima Gorochov, 2019
- Asiophlugis lobata Gorochov, 2019
- Asiophlugis longiuncus Gorochov, 2013
- Asiophlugis malacca Gorochov, 1998
- Asiophlugis paracercalis Gorochov, 2019
- Asiophlugis philippina (Jin, 1993)
- Asiophlugis rete Gorochov, 1998 - type species (locality: Taman Negara National Park, Pahang)
- Asiophlugis sulawesi (Jin, 1993)
- Asiophlugis temasek Gorochov & Tan, 2011
- Asiophlugis thaumasia (Hebard, 1922)
- Asiophlugis trusmadi Gorochov, 2011
