= Paradecolya briseferi =

Conservation status
- Critically Endangered (IUCN 3.1)

Scientific classification
- Kingdom: Animalia
- Phylum: Arthropoda
- Clade: Pancrustacea
- Class: Insecta
- Order: Orthoptera
- Suborder: Ensifera
- Family: Tettigoniidae
- Genus: Paradecolya
- Species: P. briseferi

Binomial name
- Paradecolya briseferi Hugel, 2010

Species of cricket-like animal

Paradecolya briseferi is a species of katydid endemic to the islands of Mauritius, where it only occurs in a single area of 4 km^{2} in a preserved forest. Due to its small range and the continuing decline of its habitat, it is assessed as a critically endangered species. The main threat to P. briseferi is the decline of the native forests of Mauritius due to gradual destruction by clearance and invasive plant species. The species occurs in the oldest managed area in the Brise Fer Nature Reserve, which is the best preserved relict of the native Sapotaceae forest.
