= Tyrannoraptor =

Scientific classification
- Kingdom: Animalia
- Phylum: Arthropoda
- Clade: Pancrustacea
- Class: Insecta
- Order: Orthoptera
- Suborder: Ensifera
- Family: Tettigoniidae
- Tribe: Phlugidini
- Genus: Tyrannoraptor; Mendes, Oliveira, Chamorro-Rengifo & Rafael, 2018

Genus of insects

Tyrannoraptor is a genus of South American katydids or bush crickets in the subfamily Meconematinae; the name refers to a voracious predatory habit observed in T. arboreus.

== Species ==
- T. arboreus (Nickle, 2003)
- T. venator Mendes, Oliveira, Chamorro-Rengifo & Rafael, 2018
