= Limpopo false shieldback =

Conservation status
- Least Concern (IUCN 3.1)

Scientific classification
- Domain: Eukaryota
- Kingdom: Animalia
- Phylum: Arthropoda
- Class: Insecta
- Order: Orthoptera
- Suborder: Ensifera
- Family: Tettigoniidae
- Genus: Acilacris
- Subgenus: Acilacris
- Species: A. obovatus

Binomial name
- Acilacris obovatus Naskrecki, 1996

Species of cricket-like animal

The Limpopo false shieldback (Acilacris obovatus) is a tettigoniid orthopteran that is endemic to Limpopo and Mpumalanga, South Africa.
