= Acilacris =

Scientific classification
- Domain: Eukaryota
- Kingdom: Animalia
- Phylum: Arthropoda
- Class: Insecta
- Order: Orthoptera
- Suborder: Ensifera
- Family: Tettigoniidae
- Subfamily: Meconematinae
- Tribe: Meconematini
- Subtribe: Acilacridina
- Genus: Acilacris; Bolívar, 1890

Subgenera
- 2, see text.

Genus of cricket-like animals

Acilacris is a genus of "false shieldback" bush crickets or katydids in the subfamily Meconematinae, found in southern Africa.

== Subgenera and species ==
Acilacris contains two subgenera, Acilacris and Aroegas:

Acilacris (Acilacris) Bolívar, 1890

1. Acilacris furcatus Naskrecki, 1996 — Mt. Coke false shieldback
2. Acilacris kristinae Naskrecki, 1996 — Kristin's false shieldback
3. Acilacris obovatus Naskrecki, 1996 — Limpopo false shieldback
4. Acilacris tridens Bolívar, 1890 - type species

Acilacris (Aroegas) Péringuey, 1916

1. Acilacris dilatatus (Naskrecki, 1996) – dilated false shieldback
2. Acilacris fuscus (Naskrecki, 1996) – brown false shieldback
3. Acilacris nigroornatus (Péringuey, 1916) – black-spotted false shieldback
4. Acilacris rentzi (Naskrecki, 1996) – Rentz's false shieldback

Note: A. incisus is now Ovonotus incisus (Naskrecki, 1996)
