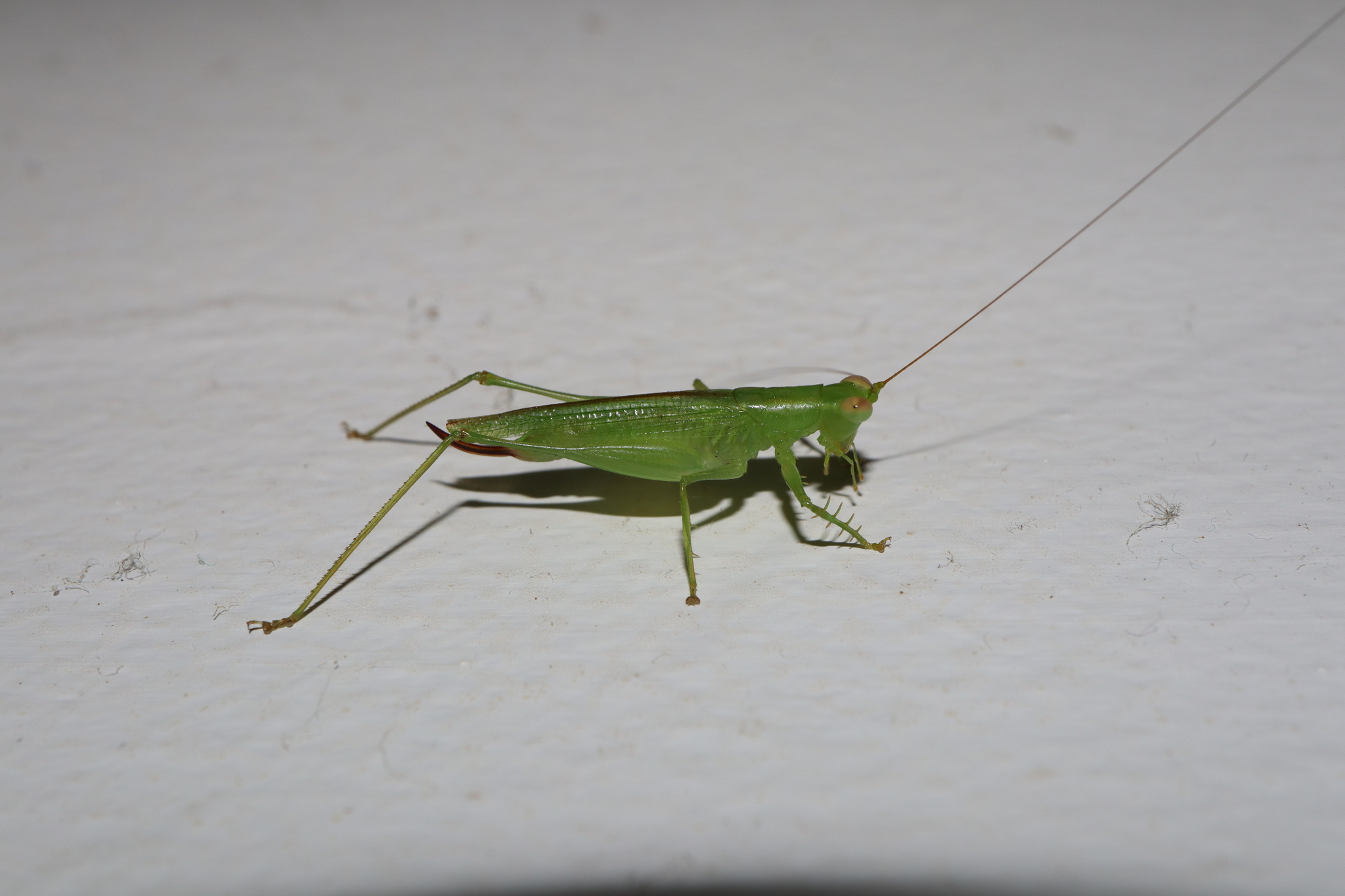
- Austrophlugis debaari

Scientific classification
- Kingdom: Animalia
- Phylum: Arthropoda
- Clade: Pancrustacea
- Class: Insecta
- Order: Orthoptera
- Suborder: Ensifera
- Family: Tettigoniidae
- Tribe: Phlugidini
- Genus: Austrophlugis; Rentz, 2001

= Austrophlugis =

Genus of insects

Austrophlugis is a genus of bush crickets or katydids belonging to the tribe Phlugidini. The species of this genus are found in Australia.

== Species ==
GBIF includes:

- Austrophlugis debaari D.C.F.Rentz, 2001
- Austrophlugis kumbumbana D.C.F.Rentz, 2001
- Austrophlugis kununurra D.C.F.Rentz, 2001
- Austrophlugis malidupa D.C.F.Rentz, 2001
- Austrophlugis manya D.C.F.Rentz, 2001
- Austrophlugis orumbera D.C.F.Rentz, 2001
- Austrophlugis quaringa D.C.F.Rentz, 2001
