= Acilacris dilatatus =

Conservation status
- Vulnerable (IUCN 3.1)

Scientific classification
- Kingdom: Animalia
- Phylum: Arthropoda
- Clade: Pancrustacea
- Class: Insecta
- Order: Orthoptera
- Suborder: Ensifera
- Family: Tettigoniidae
- Genus: Acilacris
- Subgenus: Aroegas
- Species: A. dilatatus

Binomial name
- Acilacris dilatatus (Naskrecki, 1996)

Synonyms
- Aroegas dilatatus Naskrecki, 1996

Species of cricket-like animal

Acilacris dilatatus, the dilated false shieldback, is a species of katydid that is only known from the Mariepskop Forest in Mpumalanga province, South Africa.
