= Paradecolya inexspectata =

Scientific classification
- Kingdom: Animalia
- Phylum: Arthropoda
- Clade: Pancrustacea
- Class: Insecta
- Order: Orthoptera
- Suborder: Ensifera
- Family: Tettigoniidae
- Genus: Paradecolya
- Species: P. inexspectata

Binomial name
- Paradecolya inexspectata (Chopard, 1957)

Synonyms
- Decolya inexspectata Chopard, 1957

Species of cricket-like animal

Paradecolya inexspectata is a species of insect, belonging to the family Tettigoniidae.

This species is known from La Réunion. It has a body length of approximately 15mm.
