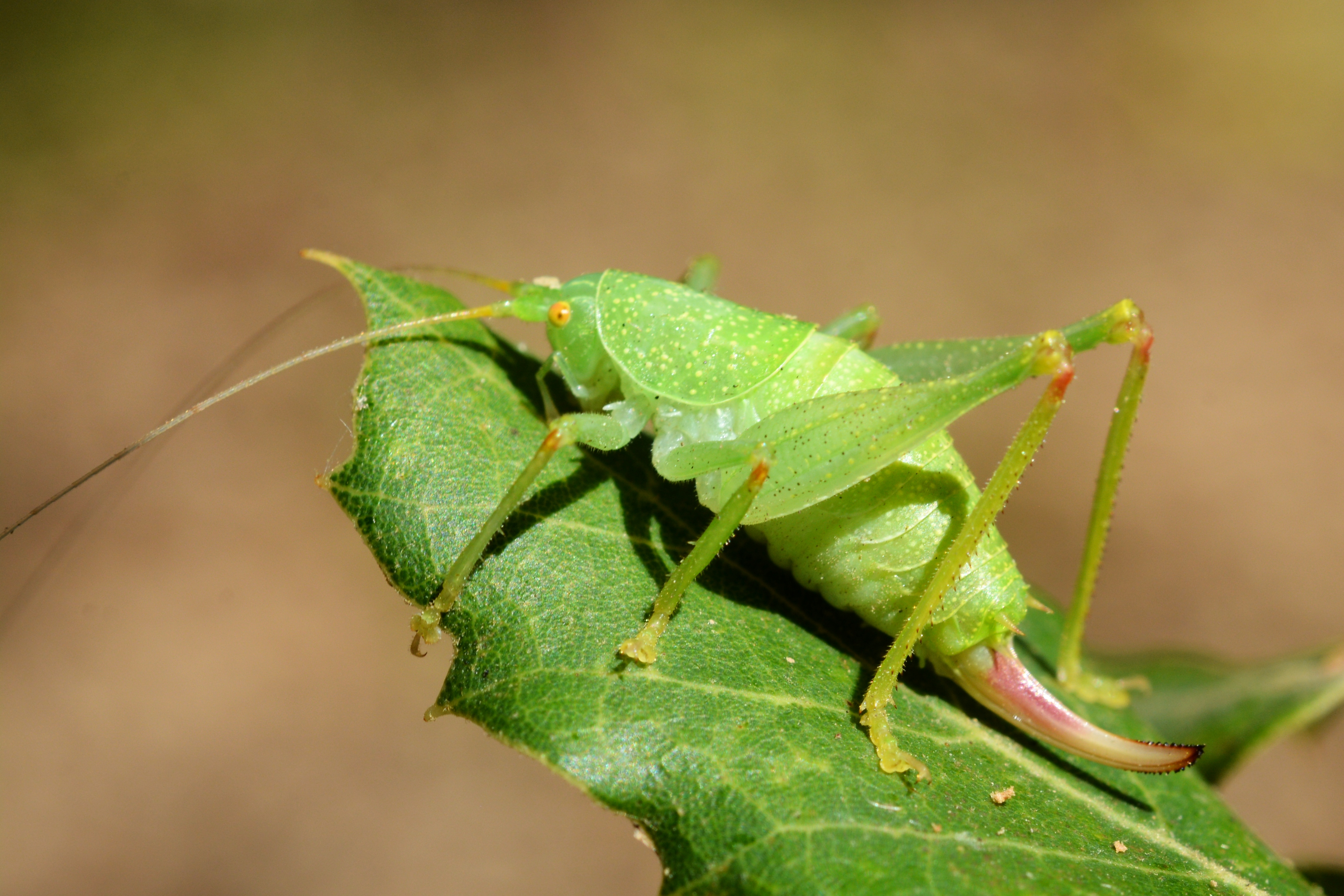
- Cyrtaspis scutata

Scientific classification
- Domain: Eukaryota
- Kingdom: Animalia
- Phylum: Arthropoda
- Class: Insecta
- Order: Orthoptera
- Suborder: Ensifera
- Family: Tettigoniidae
- Subfamily: Meconematinae
- Tribe: Meconematini
- Genus: Cyrtaspis; Fischer, 1853

= Cyrtaspis =

Genus of cricket-like animals

Cyrtaspis is a genus of bush crickets belonging to the tribe Meconematini within the subfamily Meconematinae. They are found in mainland Western Europe (not the British Isles) and North Africa.

== Species ==
The Orthoptera Species File lists the following species:

- Cyrtaspis scutata (Charpentier, 1825) – type species (as Barbitistes scutatus Charpentier, 1825, locality: Portugal)
- Cyrtaspis tuberculata Barranco, 2006
