= Mount Coke false shieldback =

Conservation status
- Critically Endangered (IUCN 3.1)

Scientific classification
- Domain: Eukaryota
- Kingdom: Animalia
- Phylum: Arthropoda
- Class: Insecta
- Order: Orthoptera
- Suborder: Ensifera
- Family: Tettigoniidae
- Genus: Acilacris
- Subgenus: Acilacris
- Species: A. furcatus

Binomial name
- Acilacris furcatus Naskrecki, 1996

Species of cricket-like animal

The Mount Coke false shieldback (Acilacris furcatus) is a tettigoniid orthopteran that is endemic to a single small locality in Eastern Cape Province, South Africa. It has not been seen since its original discovery in 1965.
