= Naskreckia =

Scientific classification
- Domain: Eukaryota
- Kingdom: Animalia
- Phylum: Arthropoda
- Class: Insecta
- Order: Orthoptera
- Suborder: Ensifera
- Family: Tettigoniidae
- Subfamily: Meconematinae
- Tribe: Meconematini
- Genus: Naskreckia; Gorochov, 2017

Synonyms
- Amyttacta Naskrecki, Bazelet & Spearman, 2008

Genus of cricket-like animals

Naskreckia is a genus of South African bush crickets belonging to the tribe Meconematini (subfamily Meconematinae).

== Species ==
The Orthoptera Species File lists the following species:

1. Naskreckia farrelli (Naskrecki, Bazelet, Spearman (2008) – Farrell's delicate katydid, type species (as Amyttacta farrelli from Bolobedu District, (previously Lebowa), Limpopo Province)
2. Naskreckia marakelensis (Naskrecki, Bazelet & Spearman, 2008) – Marakele delicate katydid
