= Africariola =

Scientific classification
- Domain: Eukaryota
- Kingdom: Animalia
- Phylum: Arthropoda
- Class: Insecta
- Order: Orthoptera
- Suborder: Ensifera
- Family: Tettigoniidae
- Subfamily: Meconematinae
- Tribe: Meconematini
- Subtribe: Acilacridina
- Genus: Africariola; Naskrecki, 1996

Genus of cricket-like animals

Africariola is a monotypic genus in the family Tettigoniidae found in southern Africa. The single species is A. longicauda, the Richtersveld katydid.
