= Alloteratura =

Scientific classification
- Domain: Eukaryota
- Kingdom: Animalia
- Phylum: Arthropoda
- Class: Insecta
- Order: Orthoptera
- Suborder: Ensifera
- Family: Tettigoniidae
- Tribe: Meconematini
- Genus: Alloteratura; Hebard, 1922

Type species
- Alloteratura bakeri Hebard, 1922

Genus of cricket-like animals

External image
- Image at iNaturalist

Alloteratura is a genus of Asian bush crickets belonging to the tribe Meconematini (subfamily Meconematinae). They are found in India, China, Indochina, and Malesia to New Guinea.

== Species ==
The Orthoptera Species File includes:

Subgenus Alloteratura (Alloteratura) Hebard, 1922

1. Alloteratura angulata Jin, 1995
2. Alloteratura bachma Gorochov, 2005
3. Alloteratura bakeri Hebard, 1922 – type species
4. Alloteratura belalongensis Tan, Gorochov & Wahab, 2017
5. Alloteratura carinata Gorochov, 2008
6. Alloteratura cervus Gorochov, 1998
7. Alloteratura cylindracauda Jin, 1995
8. Alloteratura flabellata Xin & Shi, 2019
9. Alloteratura gigliotosi (Karny, 1924)
10. Alloteratura hebardi Gorochov, 1998
11. Alloteratura karnyi Kästner, 1932
12. Alloteratura keyica (Karny, 1924)
13. Alloteratura klankamsorni Sänger & Helfert, 2004
14. Alloteratura kuehnelti Sänger & Helfert, 1996
15. Alloteratura lamellata Jin, 1995
16. Alloteratura longicercata (Bolívar, 1905)
17. Alloteratura megaspina Gorochov, 2016
18. Alloteratura multispina Jin, 1995
19. Alloteratura muntiacus Gorochov, 1998
20. Alloteratura parvispina Gorochov, 2016
21. Alloteratura penangica Hebard, 1922
22. Alloteratura plauta Jin, 1995
23. Alloteratura podgornajae Gorochov, 1993
24. Alloteratura quaternispina Shi, Di & Chang, 2014
25. Alloteratura siamensis Jin, 1995
26. Alloteratura simplex (Karny, 1920)
27. Alloteratura stebaevi Gorochov, 1993
28. Alloteratura subanalis (Karny, 1926)
29. Alloteratura tahanensis (Karny, 1926)
30. Alloteratura tibetensis Jin, 1995
31. Alloteratura triloba (Karny, 1926)
32. Alloteratura vietnami Gorochov, 2016
33. Alloteratura werneri (Karny, 1924)
34. Alloteratura xiphidiopsis (Karny, 1920)

Subgenus Alloteratura (Meconemopsis) Karny, 1922

1. Alloteratura bispina Gorochov, 1993
2. Alloteratura borellii (Karny, 1924)
3. Alloteratura breviuscula Gorochov, 2016
4. Alloteratura curta Gorochov, 2008
5. Alloteratura dawwruengi Tan & Artchawakom, 2017
6. Alloteratura eubispina Gorochov, 2016
7. Alloteratura kalabakanica Jin, 2020
8. Alloteratura kevani Jin, 2020
9. Alloteratura media Gorochov, 2008
10. Alloteratura nigrigutta (Karny, 1924)
11. Alloteratura pentadactyla Xin & Shi, 2019
12. Alloteratura longa Gorochov, 2008
13. Alloteratura sandakanae Hebard, 1922
14. Alloteratura sarawaki Gorochov, 2016

Subgenus not assigned

1. Alloteratura cyclolabia (Karny, 1923)
2. Alloteratura delicatula (Chopard, 1924)
3. Alloteratura longicauda (Karny, 1924)
4. Alloteratura nepalica Kevan & Jin, 1993
5. Alloteratura nigrivertex (Karny, 1924)
6. Alloteratura sinica (Bey-Bienko, 1957)
7. Alloteratura thanjavuensis Kevan & Jin, 1993
