= Paradecolya =

Scientific classification
- Domain: Eukaryota
- Kingdom: Animalia
- Phylum: Arthropoda
- Class: Insecta
- Order: Orthoptera
- Suborder: Ensifera
- Family: Tettigoniidae
- Subfamily: Meconematinae
- Genus: Paradecolya; Jin, X. & Kevan, D.(1992)

Genus of insects

Paradecolya is a genus of the family Tettigoniidae. The species are bush crickets from Indian Ocean islands.

== Species ==
- Paradecolya briseferi
- Paradecolya inexspectata
