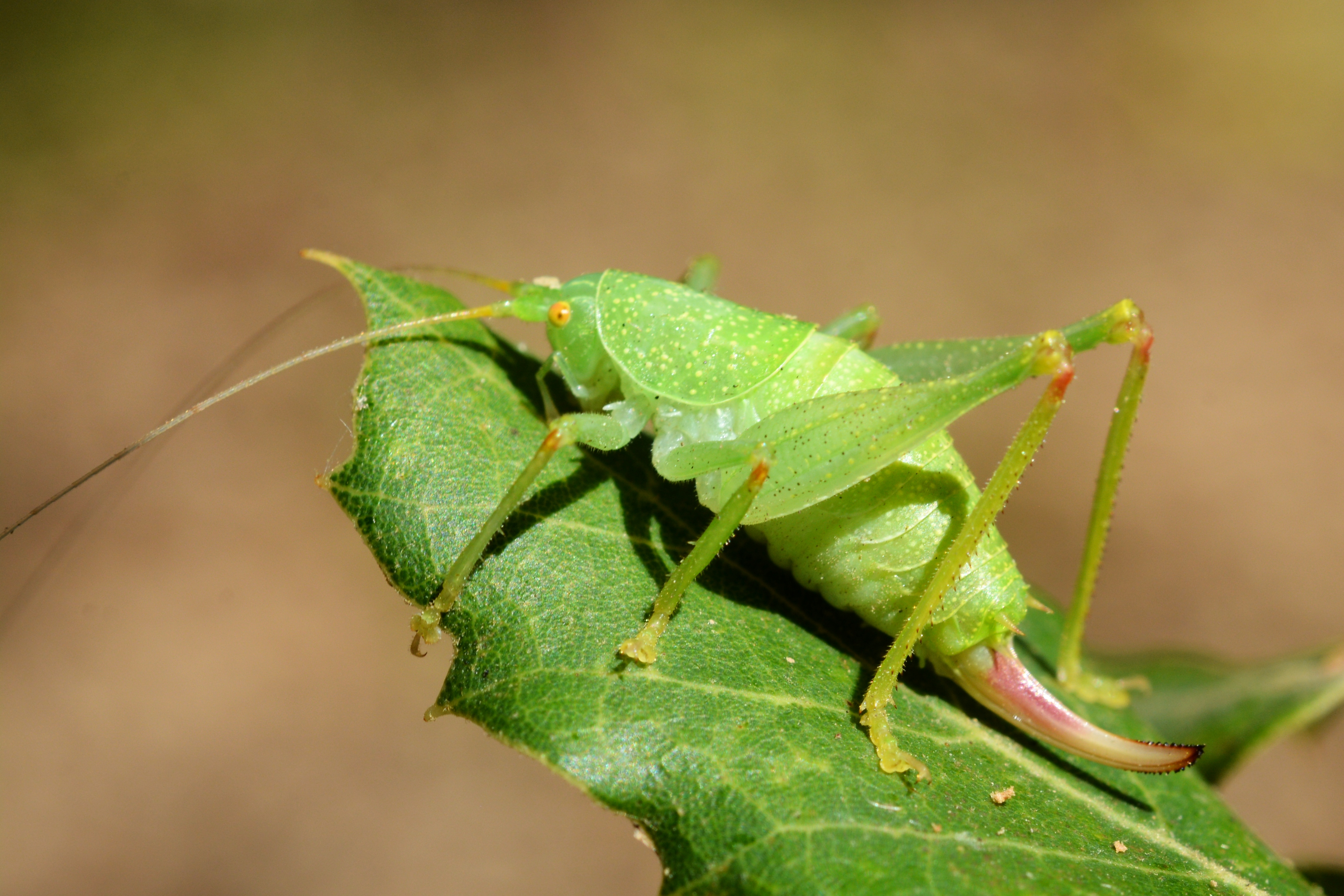
- Female

Scientific classification
- Domain: Eukaryota
- Kingdom: Animalia
- Phylum: Arthropoda
- Class: Insecta
- Order: Orthoptera
- Suborder: Ensifera
- Family: Tettigoniidae
- Subfamily: Meconematinae
- Tribe: Meconematini
- Genus: Cyrtaspis
- Species: C. scutata

Binomial name
- Cyrtaspis scutata (Charpentier, 1825)

Synonyms
- Cyrtaspis variopicta var. lineolata Costa, 1860; Cyrtaspis variopicta Costa, 1860

= Cyrtaspis scutata =

Species of cricket-like animal

Video of Cyrtaspis scutata

Cyrtaspis scutata is a species of bush cricket in the subfamily Meconematinae. Belonging to the tribe Meconematini, this brachypterous species may be called "Le Méconème scutigère" in French.

Sound of the mating call of a male C. scutata as it is being approached.

== Distribution ==
This species is found in southern Europe - France, Italy, Sicily, Spain and Portugal, Corsica, Croatia, Sardinia, Slovenia and the Azores. It is also found in the Netherlands, near the city of Amersfoort, where it was able to reproduce since, at least, 2016.
