= Guling, Guangxi =

Guling 古零镇
- Town
- Interactive map of Guling
- Location in Guangxi Guling (China)
- Coordinates: 23°38′17″N 108°18′42″E
- Country: People's Republic of China
- Autonomous Region: Guangxi
- Prefecture-level city: Nanning
- County: Mashan County
- Time zone: UTC+8 (China Standard)

Guling (Chinese: 古零) is a town of Mashan County, Guangxi, China. As of 2018, it has one residential community and 13 villages under its administration.
