= Teratura =

Scientific classification
- Domain: Eukaryota
- Kingdom: Animalia
- Phylum: Arthropoda
- Class: Insecta
- Order: Orthoptera
- Suborder: Ensifera
- Family: Tettigoniidae
- Subfamily: Meconematinae
- Tribe: Meconematini
- Genus: Teratura; Redtenbacher, 1891

Genus of cricket-like animals

Teratura is a genus of Asian bush crickets belonging to the tribe Meconematini (subfamily Meconematinae). Species have been recorded from India, Indo-China, China and Peninsular Malaysia.

== Species ==
The Orthoptera Species File lists the following:

1. Teratura albidisca Sänger & Helfert, 1998
2. Teratura angusi Gorochov, 1998
3. Teratura cincta (Bey-Bienko, 1962)
4. Teratura darevskyi Gorochov, 1993
  (synonym T. flexispatha Qiu & Shi, 2010)
5. Teratura hastata Shi, Mao & Ou, 2007
6. Teratura lyra Gorochov, 2001
7. Teratura maculata Ingrisch, 1990
8. Teratura monstrosa Redtenbacher, 1891 – type species, locality: Carin-Ghecü, Myanmar
9. Teratura paracincta Gorochov & Kang, 2005
10. Teratura pulchella Gorochov & Kang, 2005

Note:

- Two subgenera, Macroteratura and Stenoteratura are now placed in genus Macroteratura Gorochov, 1993;
- Subgenus Megaconema has now been elevated to the monotypic genus containing Megaconema geniculata (Bey-Bienko, 1962) from China.
