= Tamdaora =

Scientific classification
- Domain: Eukaryota
- Kingdom: Animalia
- Phylum: Arthropoda
- Class: Insecta
- Order: Orthoptera
- Suborder: Ensifera
- Family: Tettigoniidae
- Subfamily: Meconematinae
- Tribe: Meconematini
- Genus: Tamdaora; Gorochov, 1998

Type species
- Tamdaora magnifica Gorochov, 1998

Genus of cricket-like animals

Tamdaora is a genus of Asian bush crickets belonging to the tribe Meconematini in the subfamily Meconematinae. This genus is named after Tam Đảo National Park in northern Vietnam, where the type species was found. They are found in Indo-China and China.

== Species ==
As of 2022, Orthoptera Species File lists the following species:

1. Tamdaora curvicerca Wang & Liu, 2018 - Zayü County, Arunachal Pradesh
2. Tamdaora longipennis (Liu & Zhang, 2000) - Menglong Mengsong, Yunnan
3. Tamdaora magnifica Gorochov, 1998 – type species, locality: near Tam Dao village, Vinh Phu Province, Vietnam
