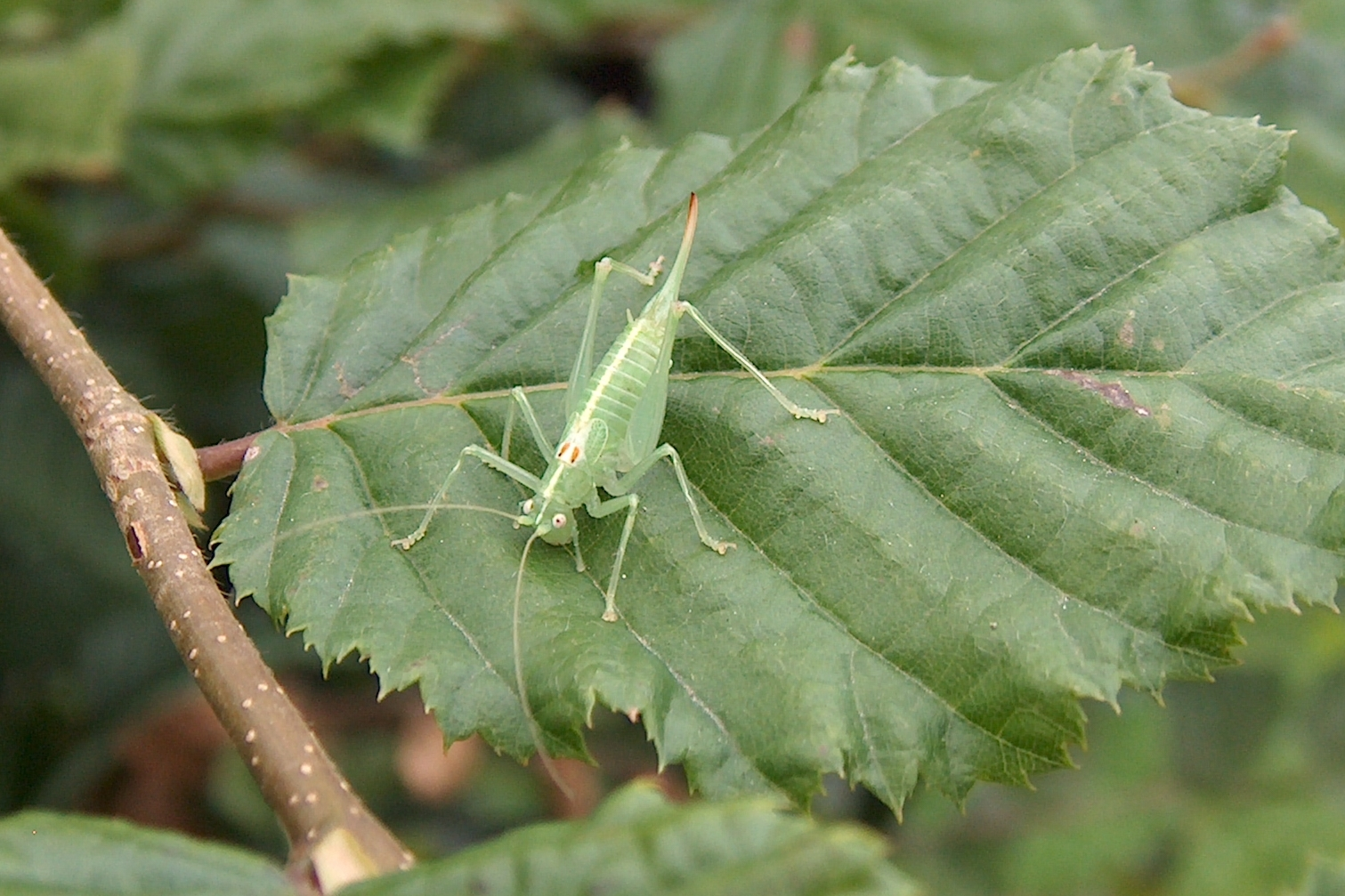
- Meconema meridionale
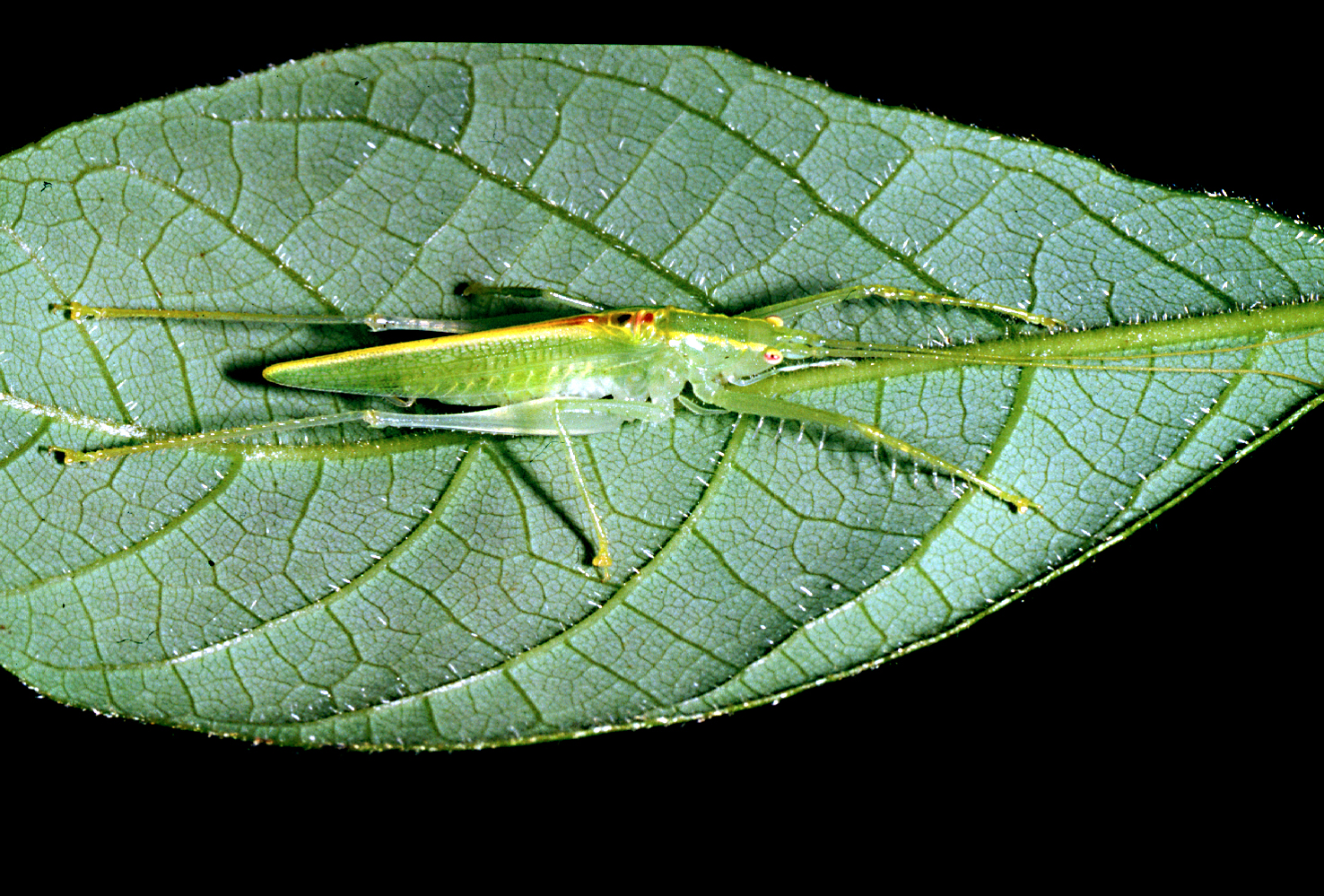
- Paraphisis sp.

Scientific classification
- Kingdom: Animalia
- Phylum: Arthropoda
- Class: Insecta
- Order: Orthoptera
- Suborder: Ensifera
- Family: Tettigoniidae
- Subfamily: Meconematinae; Burmeister, 1838

Genera
- See text

= Meconematinae =

Subfamily of cricket-like animals

Meconematinae is a subfamily of the bush crickets, with a worldwide distribution (but very limited representation in Antarctica and North America).

== Tribes and genera ==
In the Orthoptera Species File, the following are listed:

=== Meconematini ===
Authority: Burmeister 1838

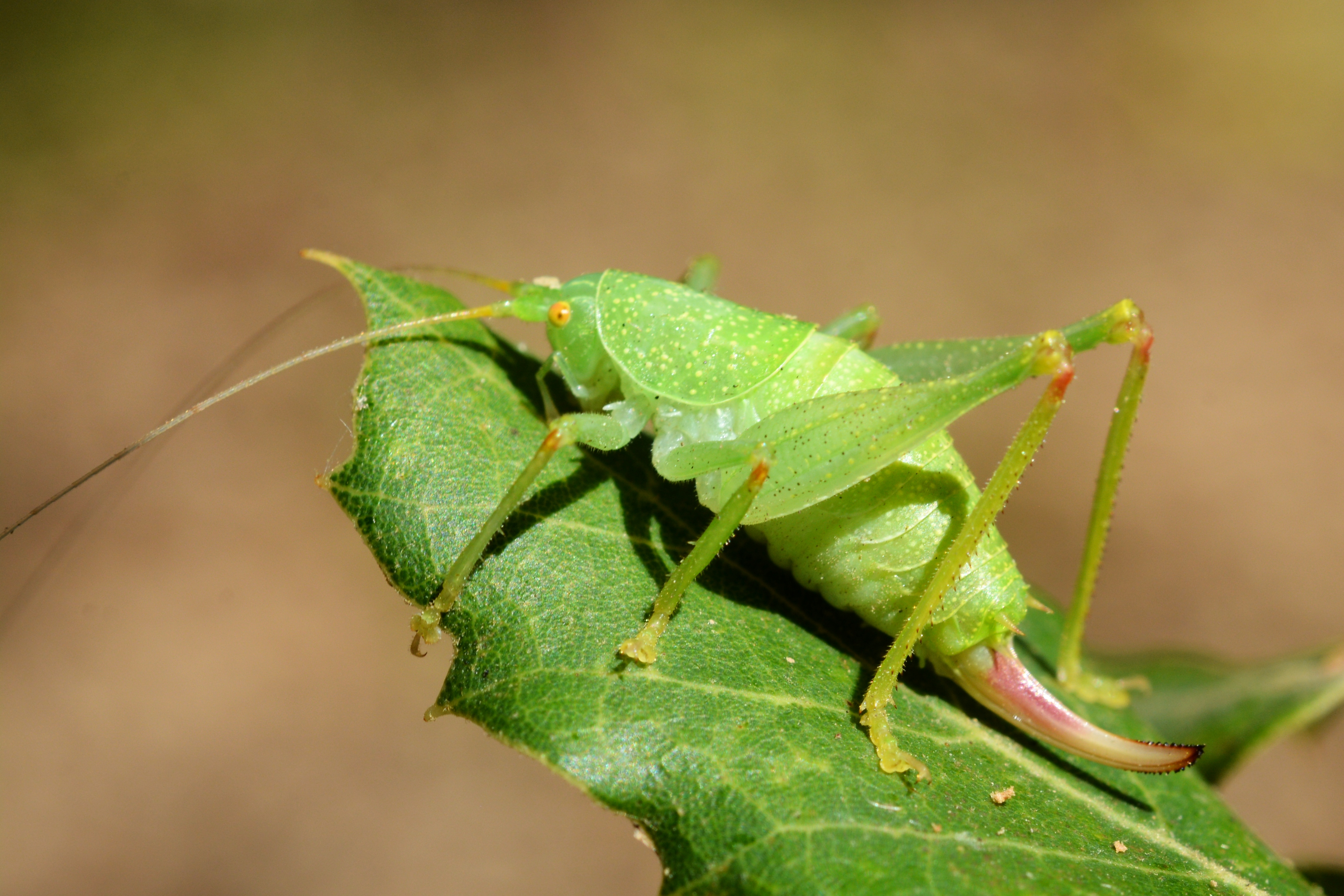
Cyrtaspis scutata female

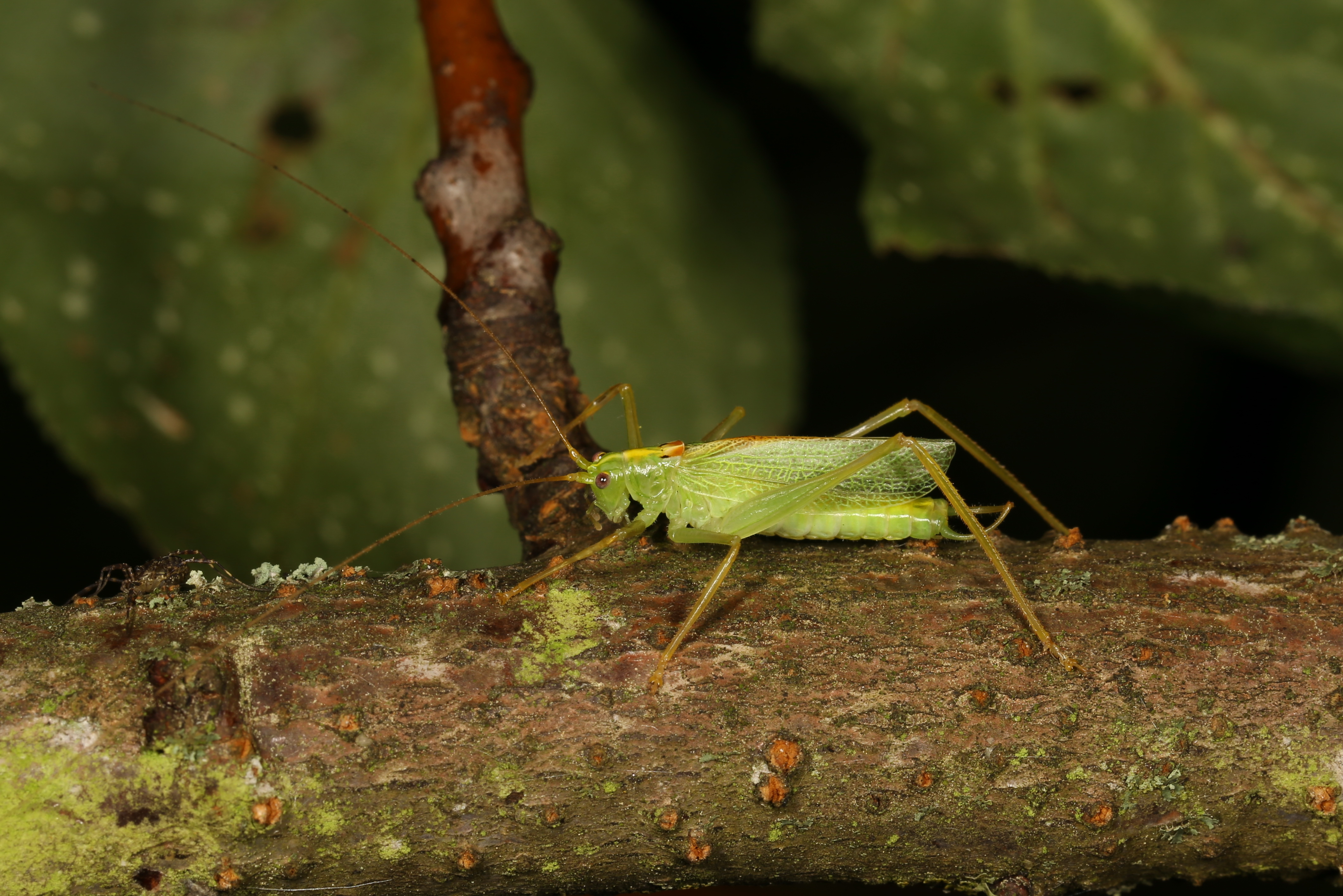
Meconema thalassinum male

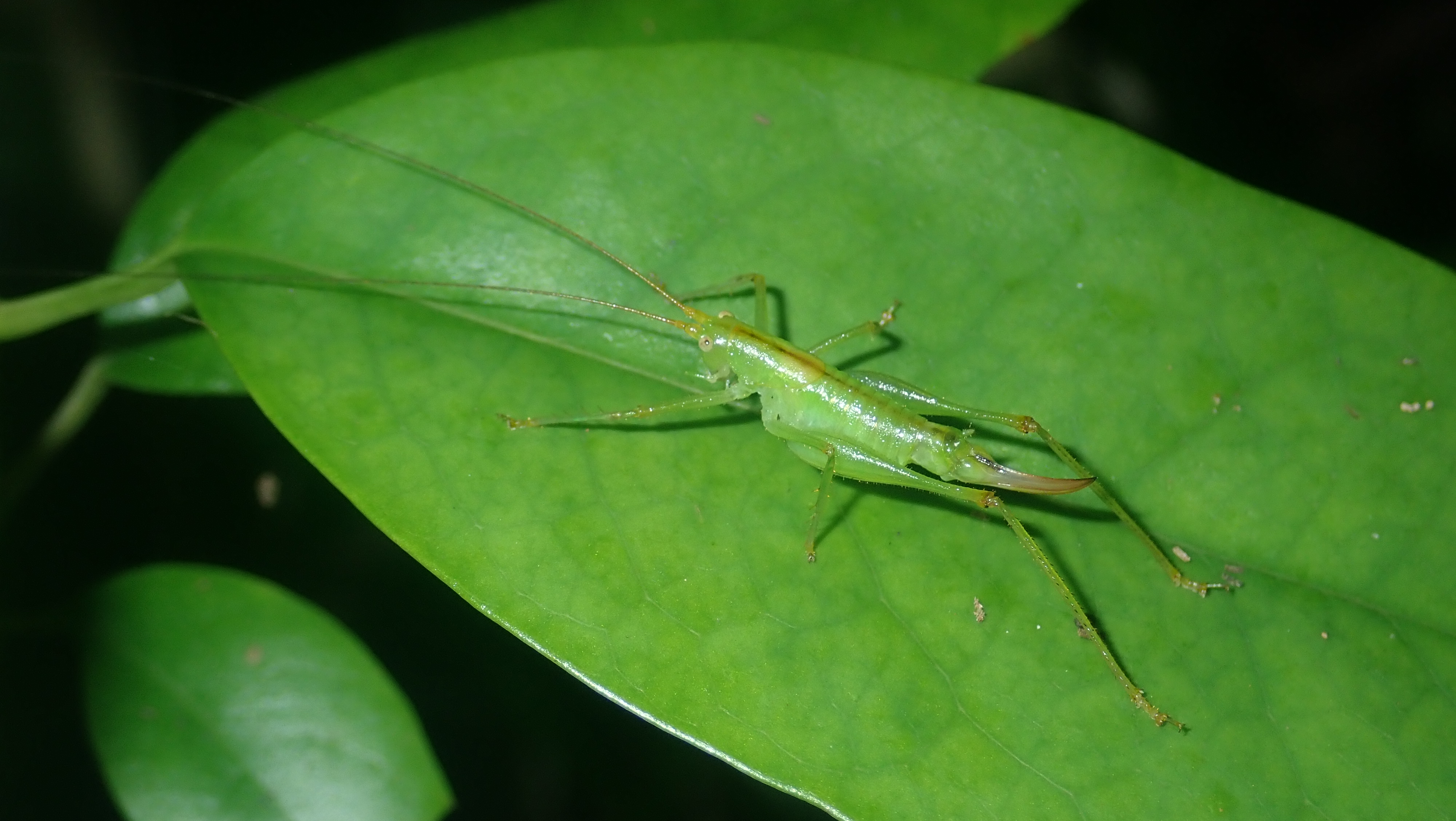
Cosmetura amamiensis female

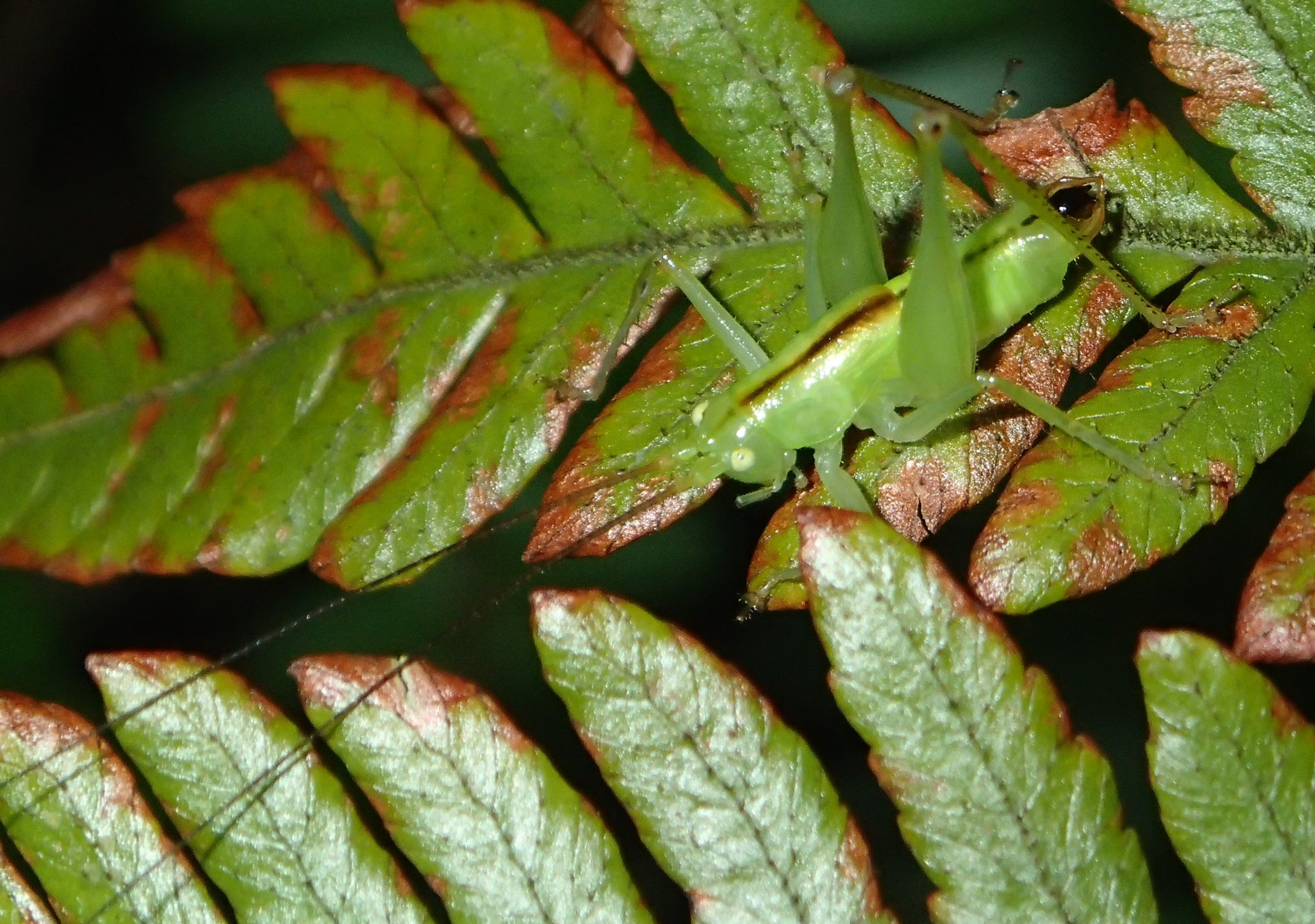
Cosmetura amamiensis male

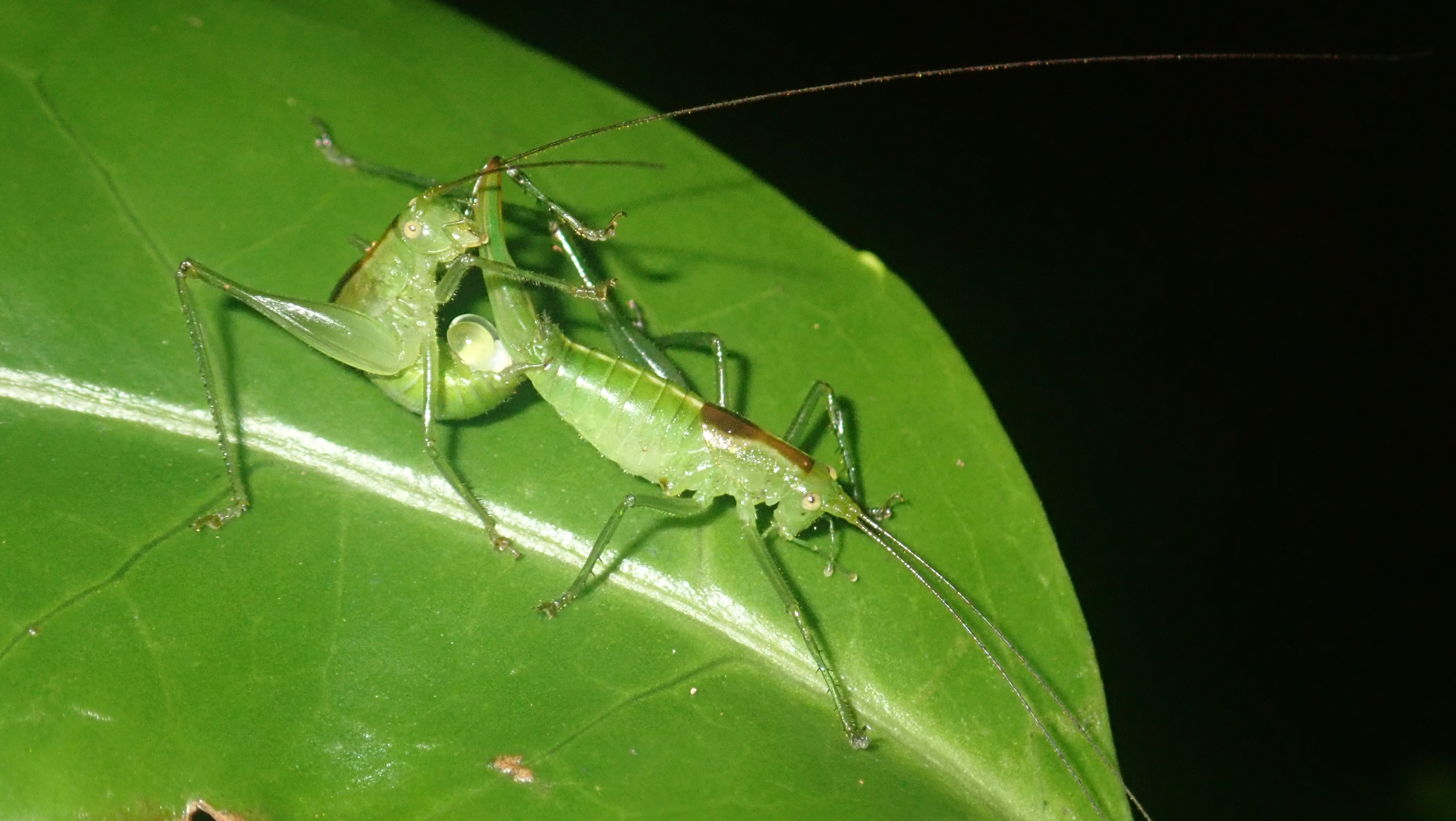
Microconocephalopsis yuwanensis copulation

subtribe Acilacridina

Authority: Gorochov, 2017 - southern Africa

1. Acilacris Bolívar, 1890 includes subgenus Aroegas Péringuey, 1916
2. Africariola - monotypic: Africariola longicauda Naskrecki, 1996
3. Ovonotus Naskrecki & Guta, 2019
4. Paracilacris Chopard, 1955

subtribe Meconematina

distribution: mostly Europe & Asia

1. Alloxiphidiopsis Liu & Zhang, 2007
2. Amyttosa Beier, 1965
3. Borneratura Gorochov, 2008
4. Brachyamytta Naskrecki, 2008
5. Breviratura Gorochov, 2008
6. Caprixizicus Gorochov, 2022
7. Kamerula Gorochov, 2017
8. Leptoteratura Yamasaki, 1982
9. Meconema Serville, 1831 - Europe
10. Naskreckia Gorochov, 2017
11. Odonturisca Gorochov, 2008
12. Parakamerula Gorochov, 2017
13. Proamytta Beier, 1965
14. Rhinoteratura Gorochov, 1993
15. Subtilodecma Gorochov, 2022
16. Xiphidiola Bolívar, 1906
17. Xiphidiopsis Redtenbacher, 1891
18. Xizicus Gorochov, 1993

subtribe not assigned

- Anepitacta Brunner von Wattenwyl, 1891 (genus group: Africa)
- Abaxinicephora Gorochov & Kang, 2005
- Acosmetura Liu, 2000
- Afroconema Gorochov, 1993
- Afromeconema Massa, 1997
- Allicyrtaspis Shi, Bian & Chang, 2013
- Allocyrtopsis Wang & Liu, 2012
- Alloteratura Hebard, 1922
- Amytta Karsch, 1888
- Amyttacta Beier, 1965
- Amyttella Beier, 1965
- Amyttopsis Beier, 1965
- Aphlugiolopsis Wang, Liu & Li, 2015
- †Archixizicus Gorochov, 2010
- Asymmetricercus Mitoki, 1999
- Athaumaspis Wang & Liu, 2014
- Borneopsis Gorochov, 2016
- Canariola Uvarov, 1940
- Cecidophagula Uvarov, 1939
- Chandozhinskia Gorochov, 1993
- Cononicephora Gorochov, 1993
- Cosmetura Yamasaki, 1983
- Cyrtaspis Fischer, 1853
- Cyrtopsis Bey-Bienko, 1962
- Decma Gorochov, 1993
- Dinoteratura Gorochov, 1998
- Doicholobosa Bian, Zhu & Shi, 2017
- †Eogrigoriora - monotypic †E. gracilis Gorochov, 2010
- Eoxizicus Gorochov, 1993
- Epiproctopsis - monotypic E. silvamontana Gorochov, 2016
- Euanisous Hebard, 1922
- Euxiphidiopsis Gorochov, 1993
- Exoteratura Gorochov, 2002
- Gibbomeconema Ishikawa, 1999
- Gonamytta Beier, 1965
- Grigoriora Gorochov, 1993
- Indokuzicus Gorochov, 1998
- Indoteratura Ingrisch & Shishodia, 2000
- Kinkiconocephalopsis Kano, 1999
- Kuzicus Gorochov, 1993
- Macroteratura Gorochov, 1993
- Megaconema Gorochov, 1993
- Microconema Liu, 2005
- Microconocephalopsis Tominaga & Kano, 1999
- Nefateratura Ingrisch & Shishodia, 2000
- Neocononicephora Gorochov, 1998
- Neocosmetura Xin, Wang & Shi, 2020
- Neocyrtopsides Chang, Wang & Shi, 2021
- Neocyrtopsis Liu & Zhang, 2007
- Neoxizicus Gorochov, 1998
- Nicephora Bolívar, 1900
- Nigrimacula Shi, Bian & Zhou, 2016
- Nipponomeconema Yamasaki, 1983
- Omkoiana Sänger & Helfert, 2002
- Orophilopsis Chopard, 1945
- Paracosmetura Liu, 2000
- Parakuzicus Ingrisch & Shishodia, 2000
- Paranicephora Gorochov, 2001
- Paraphlugiolopsis Bian & Shi, 2014
- Phlugiolopsis Zeuner, 1940
- Pseudocosmetura Liu, Zhou & Bi, 2010
- Pseudokuzicus Gorochov, 1993
- Pseudoteratura Gorochov, 1998
- Pseudothaumaspis Gorochov, 1998
- Pulchroteratura Tan, Gorochov & Wahab, 2017
- Shikokuconocephalopsis Kano, 1999
- Shoveliteratura Shi, Bian & Chang, 2011
- Sinocyrtaspiodea Shi & Bian, 2013
- Sinocyrtaspis Liu, 2000
- Sinodecma Shi, Bian & Chang, 2011
- Sinothaumaspis Wang, Liu & Li, 2015
- Sinoxizicus Gorochov & Kang, 2005
- Sumatropsis Gorochov, 2011
- Taiyalia Yamasaki, 1992
- Tamdaora Gorochov, 1998
- Teratura Redtenbacher, 1891
- Tettigoniopsis Yamasaki, 1982
- Thaumaspis Bolívar, 1900
- Xiphidonema Ingrisch, 1987
- Zaxiphidiopsis Gorochov, 1993 (monotypic)

=== Phisidini ===
Authority: Jin, 1987 - pan tropical

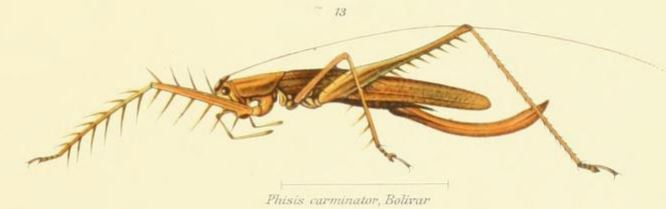
Afrophisis carminator

- subtribe Arachnoscelidina Gorochov, 2013
  - Arachnoscelis Karny, 1911 – S. America
  - Breviphisis Gorochov, 2017 - Madagascar
  - Longiphisis Gorochov, 2017 - Madagascar
  - Poecilomerus Karny, 1907 - Madagascar
  - Supersonus Sarria-S., Morris, Windmill, Jackson & Montealegre-Z., 2014 – S. America
- subtribe Beiericolyina Jin, 1992
  - Beiericolya Kaltenbach, 1968 – Pacific islands
  - Estrinia Karny, 1926 – Australia & Pacific islands
  - Meiophisis Jin, 1992 – Australia & PNG
  - Neophisis Jin, 1990 – Indo-China through to Pacific Islands
  - Oceaniphisis Jin, 1992 –Pacific islands
  - Paraphisis Karny, 1912 – Australia & PNG
- subtribe Phisidina Jin, 1987
  - Afrophisis Jin & Kevan, 1991 - Africa
    - subgenus Afrophisis Jin & Kevan, 1991
    - subgenus Jinkevania Gorochov, 2017
  - Biproctis : B. anatomensis Jin, 1992 – Vanuatu
  - Brachyphisis Chopard, 1957 – Indian Ocean Islands
  - Carliphisis Jin, 1992 – Malesia
  - Comorocolya Hugel, 2012 – Comoros
  - Comorophisis Hugel, 2012 – Comoros
  - Decolya Bolívar, 1900 -India
    - subgenus Decolya Bolívar, 1900
    - subgenus Eusrilankana Özdikmen, 2010
  - Kevanophisis Jin, 1992 : K. ponapensis Kevan, 1992 – Pacific Islands
  - Malagasyphisis: M maromizaha Hugel, 2012 - Madagascar
  - Oediphisis: O. petalispina Jin, 1992 - Sulawesi
  - Paradecolya Jin, 1992 – Indian Ocean Islands
  - Phisis Stål, 1861 – Malesia through to Pacific Islands
  - Rodriguesiophisis Hugel, 2010 R. spinifera (Butler, 1876) – Rodrigues Island endemic
  - Seselphisis Hugel, 2012 – Seychelles

=== Phlugidini ===
Authority: Eichler, 1938 - pan tropical

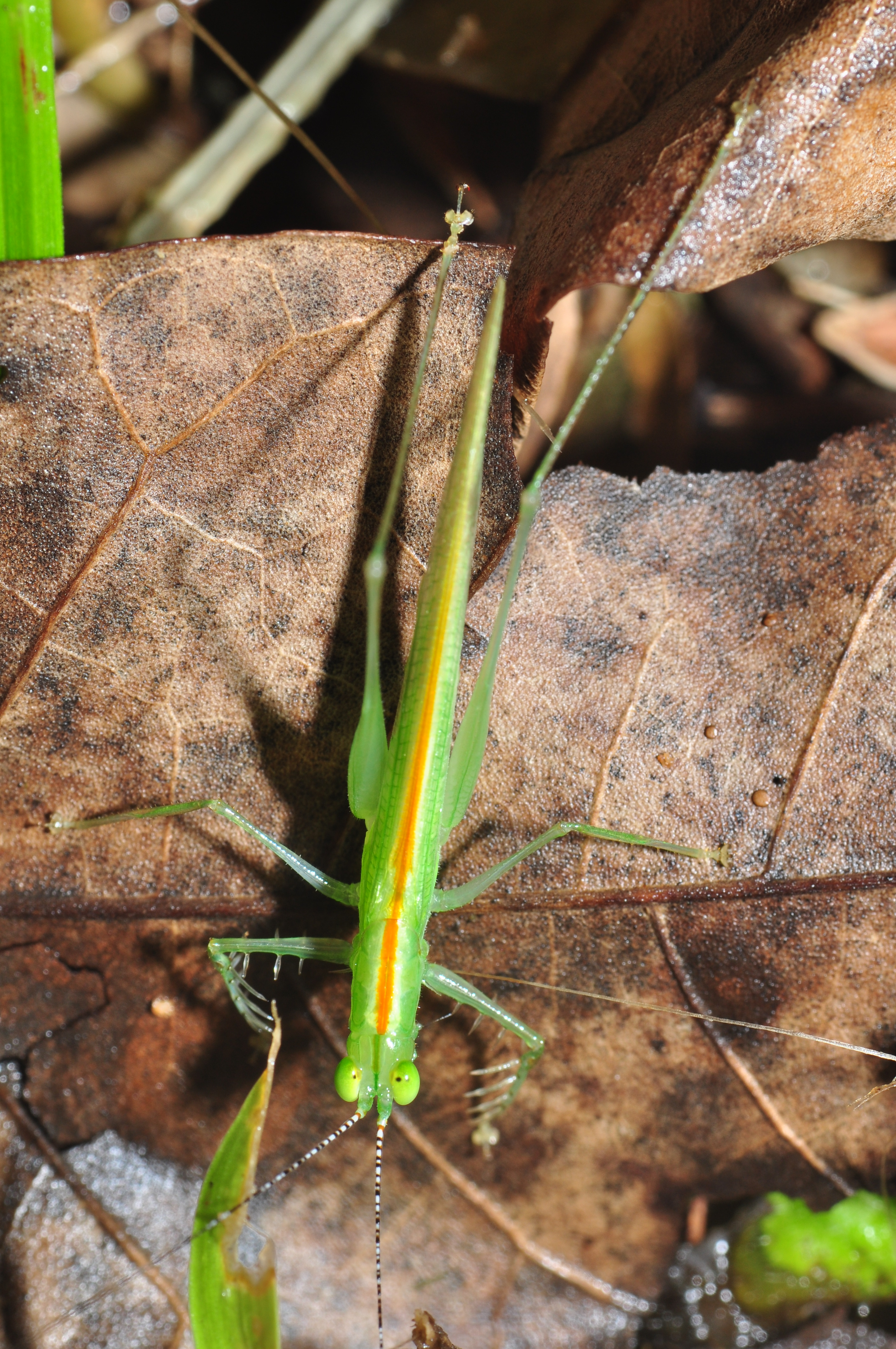
Phlugis sp.

- Anisophlugis Chamorro-Rengifo & Olivier, 2017
- Asiophlugis Gorochov, 1998 - S.E. Asia
- Austrophlugis Rentz, 2001
- Cephalophlugis Gorochov, 1998
- Indiamba Rentz, 2001
- Lucienola Gurney, 1975
- †Miophlugis Gorochov, 2010
- Neophlugis Gorochov, 2012
- Odontophlugis Gorochov, 1998
- Papuaphlugis Gorochov, 2012
- Paraphlugiola Cadena-Castañeda & Gorochov, 2014
- Phlugidia Kevan, 1993
- Phlugiola Karny, 1907
- Phlugis Stål, 1861
- Stenophlugis Gorochov, 2012
- Speculophlugis Woodrow, 2019
- Tyrannoraptor Mendes, Oliveira, Chamorro-Rengifo & Rafael, 2018
