= Xiphidiopsis =

Scientific classification
- Kingdom: Animalia
- Phylum: Arthropoda
- Clade: Pancrustacea
- Class: Insecta
- Order: Orthoptera
- Suborder: Ensifera
- Family: Tettigoniidae
- Subfamily: Meconematinae
- Tribe: Meconematini
- Genus: Xiphidiopsis; Redtenbacher, 1891

Synonyms
- Xyphidiopsis Bolívar, 1900

Genus of cricket-like animals

External image
- Images at iNaturalist

Xiphidiopsis is a genus of bush crickets in the subfamily Meconematinae. Species have been recorded from: India, China, Japan,Indochina, Malesia, and islands in the Indian Ocean and Pacific.

== Species ==
The Orthoptera Species File currently lists five subgenera with Euxiphidiopsis restored here:

subgenus Bhuxiphidiopsis

Authority: Ingrisch, 2002; locality Tongsa, Bhutan

1. Xiphidiopsis microstyla Ingrisch, 2002

=== subgenus Dinoxiphidiopsis ===
Authority: Gorochov, 1993; distribution: China and Vietnam

1. Xiphidiopsis abnormalis (Gorochov & Kang, 2005)
2. Xiphidiopsis bifurcatis Cui, Liu & Chang, 2020
3. Xiphidiopsis expressa Wang, Liu & Li, 2015
4. Xiphidiopsis fanjingshanensis Shi & Du, 2006
5. Xiphidiopsis ikonnikovi (Gorochov, 1993)
6. Xiphidiopsis jacobsoni Gorochov, 1993

=== subgenus Euxiphidiopsis ===
Authority: Gorochov, 1993; distribution: southern China and Indochina.

1. Xiphidiopsis altiterga Sänger & Helfert, 1998
2. Xiphidiopsis compacta Sänger & Helfert, 2004
3. Xiphidiopsis damingshanensis (Shi & Han, 2014)
4. Xiphidiopsis erromena (Shi & Mao, 2014)
5. Xiphidiopsis eversmanni Gorochov, 1993
6. Xiphidiopsis gurneyi Tinkham, 1944
7. Xiphidiopsis haudlata Gorochov, 1994
8. Xiphidiopsis impressa Bey-Bienko, 1962
9. Xiphidiopsis lacusicerca Shi, Zheng & Jiang, 1995
10. Xiphidiopsis motshulskyi Gorochov, 1993
  (type: locality Hà Sơn Bình, Vietnam)
11. Xiphidiopsis nigrovittata Bey-Bienko, 1962
12. Xiphidiopsis ovalis (Liu & Zhang, 2007)
13. Xiphidiopsis platycerca Bey-Bienko, 1962
14. Xiphidiopsis protensa Han, Chang & Shi, 2015
15. Xiphidiopsis quadridentata (Liu & Zhang, 2000)
16. Xiphidiopsis sinensis Tinkham, 1944
17. Xiphidiopsis spathulata (Mao & Shi, 2007)
18. Xiphidiopsis tonicosa Shi & Chen, 2002
19. Xiphidiopsis triloba (Shi, Bian & Chang, 2011)

subgenus Paraxiphidiopsis Gorochov, 1993

1. Xiphidiopsis zubovskyi Gorochov, 1993 (locality Tam Đảo National Park, Vietnam)

=== subgenus Xiphidiopsis ===
Authority: Redtenbacher, 1891

1. Xiphidiopsis acuminata Jin, 2020
2. Xiphidiopsis adelungi Gorochov, 1993
3. Xiphidiopsis alatissima Karny, 1907
4. Xiphidiopsis altiterga Sänger & Helfert, 1998
5. Xiphidiopsis amnicola Gorochov, 1998
6. Xiphidiopsis angustifurca Gorochov, 2011
7. Xiphidiopsis anisolobula Han, Chang & Shi, 2015
8. Xiphidiopsis anomala Kevan & Jin, 1993
9. Xiphidiopsis autumnalis Gorochov, 1998
10. Xiphidiopsis beybienkoi Gorochov, 1993
11. Xiphidiopsis bicarinata Jin, 2020
12. Xiphidiopsis bifoliata Shi & Zheng, 1995
13. Xiphidiopsis bituberculata Ebner, 1939
14. Xiphidiopsis borneensis Karny, 1925
15. Xiphidiopsis brevifurca Gorochov, 2011
16. Xiphidiopsis citrina Redtenbacher, 1891
17. Xiphidiopsis compressa Jin, 2020
18. Xiphidiopsis convexis Shi & Zheng, 1995
19. Xiphidiopsis cyclolobia Karny, 1923
20. Xiphidiopsis dicera Hebard, 1922
21. Xiphidiopsis dichotoma Jin, 2020
22. Xiphidiopsis dissita Gorochov, 1998
23. Xiphidiopsis divida Shi & Zheng, 1995
24. Xiphidiopsis drepanophora Hebard, 1922
25. Xiphidiopsis elefan Gorochov, 2005
26. Xiphidiopsis elongata Xia & Liu, 1993
27. Xiphidiopsis excavata Xia & Liu, 1993
28. Xiphidiopsis exigua Karny, 1926
29. Xiphidiopsis fallax Redtenbacher, 1891
  type species (Malesia, various localities)
30. Xiphidiopsis forficula Uvarov, 1923
31. Xiphidiopsis greeni Uvarov, 1923
32. Xiphidiopsis gressitti Jin, 2020
33. Xiphidiopsis hebardi Karny, 1924
34. Xiphidiopsis hwangi Bey-Bienko, 1962
35. Xiphidiopsis impressa Bey-Bienko, 1962
36. Xiphidiopsis inflata Shi & Zheng, 1995
37. Xiphidiopsis jambi Gorochov, 2008
38. Xiphidiopsis jinxiuensis Xia & Liu, 1990
39. Xiphidiopsis kemneri Ander, 1937
40. Xiphidiopsis kraussi Karny, 1924
41. Xiphidiopsis lata Bey-Bienko, 1962
42. Xiphidiopsis lita Hebard, 1922
43. Xiphidiopsis maai Jin, 2020
44. Xiphidiopsis mada Gorochov, 2016
45. Xiphidiopsis malabarica Kevan & Jin, 1993
46. Xiphidiopsis minorincisus Han, Chang & Shi, 2015
47. Xiphidiopsis monstrosa Karny, 1924
48. Xiphidiopsis nepalensis Kevan & Jin, 1993
49. Xiphidiopsis ocellata Bey-Bienko, 1971
50. Xiphidiopsis ornata Gorochov, 2019
51. Xiphidiopsis padangi Gorochov, 2008
52. Xiphidiopsis parallela Bey-Bienko, 1962
53. Xiphidiopsis phetchaburi Gorochov, 1998
54. Xiphidiopsis phyllocercus Karny, 1907
55. Xiphidiopsis redtenbacheri Karny, 1924
56. Xiphidiopsis sabahi Gorochov, 2008
57. Xiphidiopsis sarawaka Bey-Bienko, 1971
58. Xiphidiopsis shcherbakovi Gorochov, 2019
59. Xiphidiopsis spoona Cui, Liu & Chang, 2020
60. Xiphidiopsis straminula (Walker, 1871)
61. Xiphidiopsis sulcata Xia & Liu, 1990
62. Xiphidiopsis sumatrensis Karny, 1924
63. Xiphidiopsis symmetrica Gorochov, 2011
64. Xiphidiopsis tembelingi Gorochov, 2016
65. Xiphidiopsis trifoliata Wang, Chen & Shi, 2019
66. Xiphidiopsis trusmadi Gorochov, 2008
67. Xiphidiopsis vernalis Gorochov, 1998

=== subgenus not assigned ===
1. Xiphidiopsis compacta Sänger & Helfert, 2004
2. Xiphidiopsis gracilis Sänger & Helfert, 2004
3. Xiphidiopsis hoabinh Gorochov, 2005
4. Xiphidiopsis jugata Gorochov, 2016
5. Xiphidiopsis lampungi Gorochov, 2022
6. Xiphidiopsis laosi Gorochov, 2022
7. Xiphidiopsis madras Gorochov, 2005
8. Xiphidiopsis subpunctata (Motschulsky, 1866)
9. Xiphidiopsis tonicosa Shi & Chen, 2002

Note

The species Zaxiphidiopsis bazyluki (Bey-Bienko, 1971), from Cúc Phương National Park, Hoa Binh Province, Vietnam, was elevated from subgenus Xiphidiopsis (Zaxiphidiopsis) bazyluki, to a new monotypic genus Zaxiphidiopsis having originally been placed here.
