= Thespinae =

Scientific classification
- Kingdom: Animalia
- Phylum: Arthropoda
- Clade: Pancrustacea
- Class: Insecta
- Superorder: Dictyoptera
- Order: Mantodea
- Family: Thespidae
- Subfamily: Thespinae

Subfamily of praying mantises

Thespinae is a subfamily of mantises in the family Thespidae. There are 16 genera and at least 40 described species: found in most continents.

== Genera ==
The following genera are recognised in the subfamily Thespinae:

Tribe Oligonychini

- Subtribe Oligonychina
  - Bistanta Anderson, 2018
  - Galapagia Scudder, 1893
  - Liguanea Rehn & Hebard, 1938
  - Oligonicella Giglio-Tos, 1915
  - Oligonyx Saussure, 1869
  - Piscomantis Rivera & Vergara-Cobián
  - Thesprotia Stal, 1877
- Subtribe Pogonogasterina
  - Carrikerella Hebard, 1921
  - Pogonogaster Rehn, 1918
  - Thesprotiella Giglio-Tos, 1915

Tribe Thespini

- Macromusonia Hebard, 1922
- Musonia Stal, 1877
- Musoniola Giglio-Tos, 1917
- Paramusonia Rehn, 1904
- Pseudomusonia Werner, 1909
- Thespis Serville, 1831
