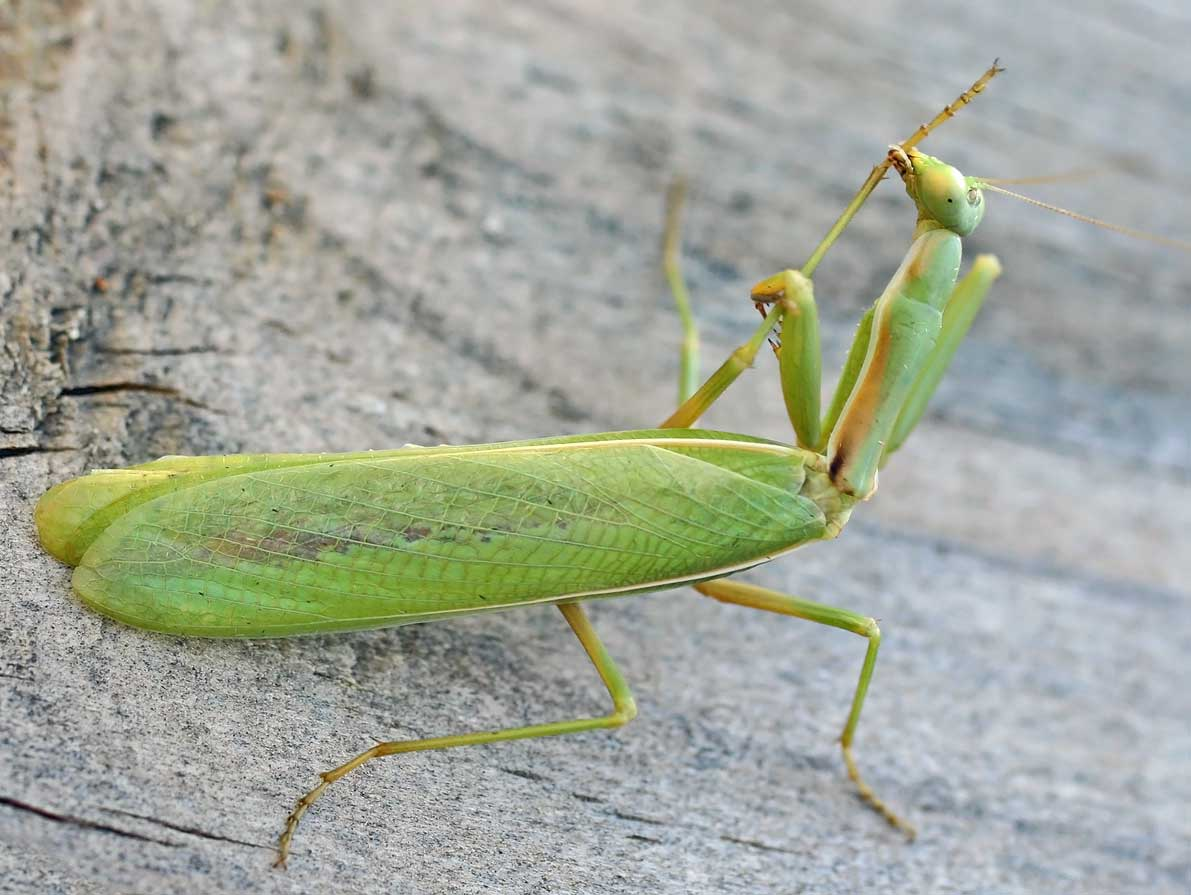

Scientific classification
- Kingdom: Animalia
- Phylum: Arthropoda
- Clade: Pancrustacea
- Class: Insecta
- Order: Mantodea
- Family: Tarachodidae; Handlirsch, 1930

Subfamilies
- see text

= Tarachodidae =

Family of praying mantises

Tarachodidae is a now obsolete family in the order Mantodea, of genera found in Africa and Asia.

== Former subfamilies ==
The family previously consisted of two subfamilies of "bark mantises":

=== Caliridinae ===
These genera have now been moved to the new families:

- Haaniidae: Caliris
- Leptomantellidae: Leptomantella

=== Tarachodinae ===
This subfamily has now been moved to the Eremiaphilidae. These genera are now placed in the subfamily Iridinae:

- Dysaules
- Iris

== See also ==
- List of mantis genera and species
