= Bantiella pallida =

Scientific classification
- Kingdom: Animalia
- Phylum: Arthropoda
- Class: Insecta
- Order: Mantodea
- Family: Thespidae
- Genus: Bantiella
- Species: B. pallida

Binomial name
- Bantiella pallida Giglio-Tos, 1915

Species of praying mantis

Bantiella pallida is a species of praying mantis in the family Thespidae.

== See also ==
- List of mantis genera and species
