= Bantiella columbina =

Scientific classification
- Domain: Eukaryota
- Kingdom: Animalia
- Phylum: Arthropoda
- Class: Insecta
- Order: Mantodea
- Family: Thespidae
- Genus: Bantiella
- Species: B. columbina

Binomial name
- Bantiella columbina Giglio-Tos 1915

Species of praying mantis

Bantiella columbina is a species of praying mantis in the family Thespidae.

== See also ==
- List of mantis genera and species
