= Bantiella hyalina =

Scientific classification
- Domain: Eukaryota
- Kingdom: Animalia
- Phylum: Arthropoda
- Class: Insecta
- Order: Mantodea
- Family: Thespidae
- Genus: Bantiella
- Species: B. hyalina

Binomial name
- Bantiella hyalina Beier, 1942

Species of praying mantis

Bantiella hyalina is a species of praying mantis in the family Thespidae.

== See also ==
- List of mantis genera and species
