= Carrikerella empusa =

Scientific classification
- Domain: Eukaryota
- Kingdom: Animalia
- Phylum: Arthropoda
- Class: Insecta
- Order: Mantodea
- Family: Thespidae
- Genus: Carrikerella
- Species: C. empusa

Binomial name
- Carrikerella empusa Rehn, 1935

Species of praying mantis

Carrikerella empusa is a species of mantis in the genus Carrikerella in the order Mantodea.

== See also ==
- List of mantis genera and species
