= Pseudopogonogaster mirabilis =

Scientific classification
- Kingdom: Animalia
- Phylum: Arthropoda
- Clade: Pancrustacea
- Class: Insecta
- Order: Mantodea
- Family: Thespidae
- Genus: Pseudopogonogaster
- Species: P. mirabilis

Binomial name
- Pseudopogonogaster mirabilis Beier, 1942

Synonyms
- Pseudopogonogaster otongica Lombardo & Ayala, 1999

Species of praying mantis

Pseudopogonogaster mirabilis is a species of praying mantis native to Colombia and Ecuador.

== See also ==
- List of mantis genera and species
