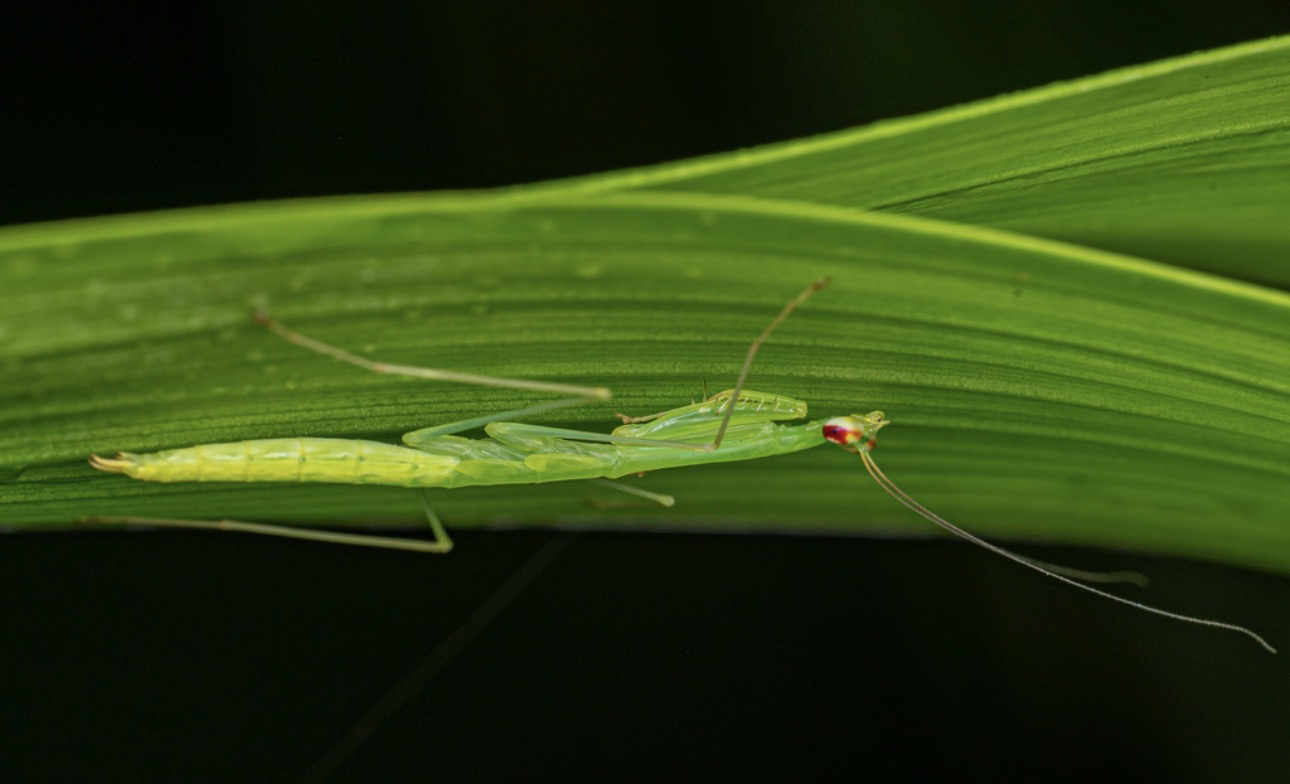
- Aetaella pluvisilvae in Sinharaja Forest Reserve

Scientific classification
- Kingdom: Animalia
- Phylum: Arthropoda
- Clade: Pancrustacea
- Class: Insecta
- Order: Mantodea
- Family: Leptomantellidae
- Genus: Aetaella
- Species: A. pluvisilvae

Binomial name
- Aetaella pluvisilvae Henry, 1931

= Aetaella pluvisilvae =

Species of praying mantis

Aetaella pluvisilvae is a species of praying mantis in the family Mantidae endemic to Sri Lanka.

== Description ==
The head is as in A. bakeri, with very large and prominent eyes. The ocelli are very large, oval, and set in an almost equilateral triangle; the anterior ocellus is about two-thirds the size of the lateral ones. The clypeus is rather gibbous. The pronotum is slender, evenly rounded in front, and very slightly emarginate at the posterior border. Its edges are minutely tuberculate, each tubercle bearing a small seta. The supra-coxal expansion is slight, the transverse sulcus is fairly deep, and a very slight medial carinula extends along the metazona. The prozona is about one-third the length of the metazona. The anterior coxae are as long as the metazona. The anterior femora are very minutely denticulate along the dorsal carina and minutely tuberculose along the ventral carina proximal to the first discal spine. There are four discal spines, the third being the longest and about equal in length to the greatest depth of the femur. The ventro-internal spine formula is variable. The external spines number five, including a small apical one. The closed tegmina extend just beyond the apex of the abdomen, and the wings extend about 2 mm beyond the tegmina. The cerci are tapering, projecting beyond the styles by half their length. The body is covered with sparse, pale pubescence. The colour in life is a delicate, bright green. The tegmina are greenish hyaline with slightly darker green veins.

The female resembles the male in most respects, but the ocelli are much reduced and arranged in a triangle much wider than high. The female is much less hirsute and lacks the fine pubescence on the tegmina and wings.

== Distribution and habitat ==
Specimens have been recorded from Ratnapura, Rakwana, and Labugama, taken in jungle in the high-rainfall area to the southwest of Sri Lanka's main mountain mass.
