= Carrikerella ceratophora =

Scientific classification
- Domain: Eukaryota
- Kingdom: Animalia
- Phylum: Arthropoda
- Class: Insecta
- Order: Mantodea
- Family: Thespidae
- Genus: Carrikerella
- Species: C. ceratophora

Binomial name
- Carrikerella ceratophora Hebard, 1922

Species of praying mantis

Carrikerella ceratophora is a species of mantis in the genus Carrikerella in the order Mantodea.

== See also ==
- List of mantis genera and species
