= Iris orientalis (insect) =

Scientific classification
- Kingdom: Animalia
- Phylum: Arthropoda
- Clade: Pancrustacea
- Class: Insecta
- Order: Mantodea
- Family: Eremiaphilidae
- Genus: Iris
- Species: I. orientalis

Binomial name
- Iris orientalis Wood-Mason, 1882

Species of praying mantis

Iris orientalis is a species of praying mantis found in Asia.

== Range ==
Afghanistan, Java, India, Nepal, Pakistan (NW-Himalaya: Kulu Valley, Kangra ).

== See also ==
- List of mantis genera and species
- Iris oratoria
