= Thesprotia infumata =

Scientific classification
- Kingdom: Animalia
- Phylum: Arthropoda
- Clade: Pancrustacea
- Class: Insecta
- Order: Mantodea
- Family: Thespidae
- Genus: Thesprotia
- Species: T. infumata

Binomial name
- Thesprotia infumata Serville, 1839

Species of praying mantis

Thesprotia infumata is a species of mantis found in Argentina, Bolivia, Brazil, and Paraguay.
