= Oligonyx dohrnianus =

Scientific classification
- Domain: Eukaryota
- Kingdom: Animalia
- Phylum: Arthropoda
- Class: Insecta
- Order: Mantodea
- Family: Thespidae
- Tribe: Oligonychini
- Subtribe: Oligonychina
- Genus: Oligonyx
- Species: O. dohrnianus

Binomial name
- Oligonyx dohrnianus Saussure & Zehntner, 1894

Species of praying mantis

Oligonyx dohrnianus is a species of mantid in the family Thespidae.
