= Thesprotia fuscipennis =

Scientific classification
- Kingdom: Animalia
- Phylum: Arthropoda
- Class: Insecta
- Order: Mantodea
- Family: Thespidae
- Genus: Thesprotia
- Species: T. fuscipennis

Binomial name
- Thesprotia fuscipennis Saussure & Zehntner, 1894

Species of praying mantis

Thesprotia fuscipennis, the grass mantis, is a species of mantis found in Brazil.
