= Thesprotia simplex =

Scientific classification
- Kingdom: Animalia
- Phylum: Arthropoda
- Class: Insecta
- Order: Mantodea
- Family: Thespidae
- Genus: Thesprotia
- Species: T. simplex

Binomial name
- Thesprotia simplex Giglio-Tos, 1915

Species of praying mantis

Thesprotia simplex, the grass mantis, is a species of mantis found in Brazil.
