= Caliris elegans =

Scientific classification
- Domain: Eukaryota
- Kingdom: Animalia
- Phylum: Arthropoda
- Class: Insecta
- Order: Mantodea
- Family: Haaniidae
- Genus: Caliris
- Species: C. elegans

Binomial name
- Caliris elegans Giglio-Tos, 1915

Species of praying mantis

Caliris elegans is a mantis species in the genus Caliris found in Malaysia, Sumatra and Borneo.
