= Thesprotia insolita =

Scientific classification
- Kingdom: Animalia
- Phylum: Arthropoda
- Clade: Pancrustacea
- Class: Insecta
- Order: Mantodea
- Family: Thespidae
- Genus: Thesprotia
- Species: T. insolita

Binomial name
- Thesprotia insolita Rehn, 1935

Species of praying mantis

Thesprotia insolita, the Costa Rican grass mantis, is a species of mantis found in Costa Rica.
