= Thesprotia filum =

Scientific classification
- Kingdom: Animalia
- Phylum: Arthropoda
- Clade: Pancrustacea
- Class: Insecta
- Order: Mantodea
- Family: Thespidae
- Genus: Thesprotia
- Species: T. filum

Binomial name
- Thesprotia filum Lichtenstein, 1796

Species of praying mantis

Thesprotia filum, the grass mantis, is a species of mantis found in French Guiana, Suriname, and Trinidad.
