= Thesprotia graminis =

Scientific classification
- Kingdom: Animalia
- Phylum: Arthropoda
- Clade: Pancrustacea
- Class: Insecta
- Order: Mantodea
- Family: Thespidae
- Genus: Thesprotia
- Species: T. graminis

Binomial name
- Thesprotia graminis Scudder, 1877

Species of praying mantis

Thesprotia graminis, the American grass mantis or grass-like mantis, is a species of mantis native to the Southern United States. T. graminis have been found in Florida, Georgia, South Carolina, Alabama, Mississippi, Louisiana, and Texas. This species can reproduce parthenogenetically or through sexual reproduction. T. graminis are similar in appearance to Brunneria borealis and typically are light brown in color.

== Life cycle ==
Mantids undergo hemimetabolism, a type of insect development that involves going through three life stages: egg, nymph (juvenile), and adult. Previously poorly documented, the reproductive ecology of T. graminis has recently been expanded upon. In a Master's Thesis conducted at Texas A&M University San Antonio, T. graminis captured from the wild were recently documented exhibiting a pseudo-iteroparous reproductive strategy as a semelparous species, with individuals either laying only once or laying additional egg cases before their death.

=== Eggs ===
The eggs are laid in an oothecae. The female deposits a frothy material into which she places two rows of eggs. After deposition, the froth hardens, forming a protective structure that guards against predators and is largely weather resistant. Females were documented, averaging laying 3.67 oothecae. Each oothecae that was laid after the first oothecae were smaller in size.

=== Nymphs ===
The nymphs appear as smaller versions of adults. For T. graminis, the number of nymphal instars differs between the sexes. Females will typically undergo seven molts while males only undergo six. The nymphs do not have functional reproductive organs or wings. The first instar is a non-feeding stage and only lasts for a very short period of time. During the second instar, the nymphs begin hunting and consuming food. Though some mantid species early instar stages can superficially look like ants as a form of protective mimicry, the elongate body of T. graminis nymphs are less ant-like than other species. As nymphs progress into later instar stages it becomes more difficult to distinguish them from adult females, since both lack wings.

=== Adults ===
Adults generally range in size from 47 and 56 mm in length, though they can be larger. A specimen collected from Punta Gorda, Florida was measured to be 60.5 mm in length. Only adult males have wings, which is not uncommon in Thespidae. T. graminis have a triangular head with small black spots on ridges above the eyes that terminates in two upwards points. The antennae are typically longer on males than females. One of the distinguishing characteristics for this species is the length of the posterior portion of the pronotum is 3 to 4 times longer than the anterior portion. Another distinguishing feature of this species is the foreleg which have one single large dorsal spine.

== Diet ==
Mantids feed on a variety of organisms including flies, moths, small Orthoptera, beetles, Hemiptera, spiders, and even other mantids. Adult T. graminis will readily feed on large flies or small to medium sized moths.

== Habitat ==
Despite their common name, T. graminis can also be found in a variety of habitat types, not just grasslands, including pine stands, thickets, and Spanish moss (Tillandsia usneoides). Due to their resemblance to pine needles, they can be very well camouflaged where ground cover is dominated by pine needles.

== Behaviors ==
Similar to stick insects, T. graminis will extend their pro-thoracic legs forward and sway from left and right to provide camouflage.

== Knowledge gaps ==
Nymphs and adults have a specialized hearing apparatus consisting of two tympana located in a groove on the ventral side of the metathorax. While some species of mantids can exhibit sexually dimorphic characteristics of this hearing apparatus, the auditory capability has not yet been studied yet for this species.

Sexual cannibalism is frequently seen within mantids; however, for T. graminis it is currently unknown whether the species exhibits this behavior.
