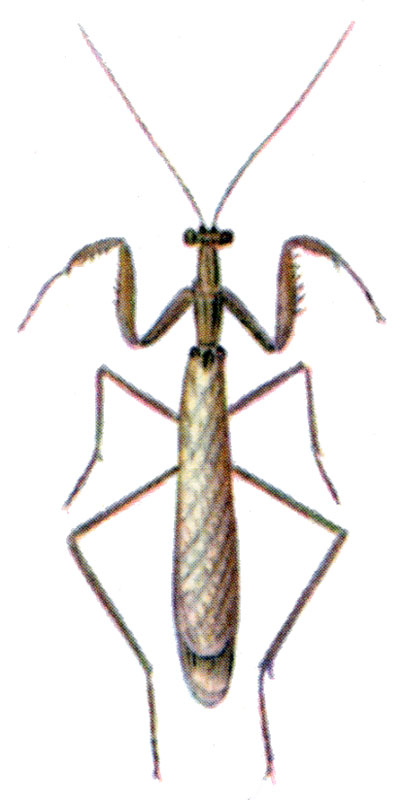

Scientific classification
- Domain: Eukaryota
- Kingdom: Animalia
- Phylum: Arthropoda
- Class: Insecta
- Order: Mantodea
- Family: Thespidae
- Genus: Oligonicella
- Species: O. bolliana

Binomial name
- Oligonicella bolliana Saussure & Zehntner, 1894

= Oligonicella bolliana =

Species of praying mantis

Oligonicella bolliana is a species of praying mantis in the family Thespidae.
