= Oligonyx bicornis =

Scientific classification
- Kingdom: Animalia
- Phylum: Arthropoda
- Class: Insecta
- Order: Mantodea
- Family: Thespidae
- Tribe: Oligonychini
- Subtribe: Oligonychina
- Genus: Oligonyx
- Species: O. bicornis

Binomial name
- Oligonyx bicornis Saussure, 1869

Species of praying mantis

Oligonyx bicornis is a species of mantid in the family Thespidae.
