= Oligonicella brunneri =

Scientific classification
- Kingdom: Animalia
- Phylum: Arthropoda
- Clade: Pancrustacea
- Class: Insecta
- Order: Mantodea
- Family: Thespidae
- Genus: Oligonicella
- Species: O. brunneri

Binomial name
- Oligonicella brunneri Saussure, 1871

Species of praying mantis

Oligonicella brunneri is one of the smallest species of praying mantis and "scarcely reach(es) one centimeter in length."
