= Pseudomusonia maculosa =

Scientific classification
- Kingdom: Animalia
- Phylum: Arthropoda
- Clade: Pancrustacea
- Class: Insecta
- Order: Mantodea
- Family: Thespidae
- Genus: Pseudomusonia
- Species: P. maculosa

Binomial name
- Pseudomusonia maculosa Chopard, 1912

Species of praying mantis

Pseudomusonia maculosa is a species of praying mantis native to French Guiana.

== See also ==
- List of mantis genera and species
