= Thesprotia maculata =

Scientific classification
- Kingdom: Animalia
- Phylum: Arthropoda
- Clade: Pancrustacea
- Class: Insecta
- Order: Mantodea
- Family: Thespidae
- Genus: Thesprotia
- Species: T. maculata

Binomial name
- Thesprotia maculata Saussure & Zehntner, 1894

Species of praying mantis

Thesprotia maculata, the grass mantis, is a species of mantis found in Bolivia and Brazil.
