= Caliri =

Caliri is a surname. Notable people with the surname include:

- Giacomo Caliri (born 1940), Italian automotive engineer
- Jamie Caliri (born 1970), American director

== See also ==
- Caliris, genus of mantises
- Calitri, town in Italy
