= Oligonyx maya =

Scientific classification
- Kingdom: Animalia
- Phylum: Arthropoda
- Clade: Pancrustacea
- Class: Insecta
- Order: Mantodea
- Family: Thespidae
- Tribe: Oligonychini
- Subtribe: Oligonychina
- Genus: Oligonyx
- Species: O. maya

Binomial name
- Oligonyx maya Saussure & Zehntner, 1894

Synonyms
- Harpagonyx maya

Species of praying mantis

Oligonyx maya is a species of mantid in the family Thespidae which inhabits dry, tropical forests in the northwest of Yucatán, Mexico.

O. maya is a light brown mantid with darker brown mottling. The type specimen, a male was 37−38 mm long.

It was described in 1894 by the Swiss entomologist Henri de Saussure and the Swiss naturalist Leo Zehntner as Harpagonyx maya based on a male specimen collected from Temax. The damaged type specimen (now minus its abdomen) is held at the Natural History Museum in London.
