= Thesprotia subhyalina =

Scientific classification
- Kingdom: Animalia
- Phylum: Arthropoda
- Class: Insecta
- Order: Mantodea
- Family: Thespidae
- Genus: Thesprotia
- Species: T. subhyalina

Binomial name
- Thesprotia subhyalina Saussure, 1870

Species of praying mantis

Thesprotia subhyalina, common name grass mantis, is a species of mantis found in Brazil. It was originally identified as Oligonyx subhyalina.
