= Thesprotia brasiliensis =

Scientific classification
- Kingdom: Animalia
- Phylum: Arthropoda
- Class: Insecta
- Order: Mantodea
- Family: Thespidae
- Genus: Thesprotia
- Species: T. brasiliensis

Binomial name
- Thesprotia brasiliensis Scudder, 1877

Species of praying mantis

Thesprotia brasiliensis, the Brazilian grass mantis, is a species of mantis native to Brazil.
