= Bantia michaelisi =

Scientific classification
- Domain: Eukaryota
- Kingdom: Animalia
- Phylum: Arthropoda
- Class: Insecta
- Order: Mantodea
- Family: Thespidae
- Genus: Bantia
- Species: B. michaelisi

Binomial name
- Bantia michaelisi Beier, 1935

Species of praying mantis

Bantia michaelisi is a species of praying mantis in the family Thespidae.

== See also ==
- List of mantis genera and species
