= Thesprotia macilenta =

Scientific classification
- Kingdom: Animalia
- Phylum: Arthropoda
- Clade: Pancrustacea
- Class: Insecta
- Order: Mantodea
- Family: Thespidae
- Genus: Thesprotia
- Species: T. macilenta

Binomial name
- Thesprotia macilenta Saussure & Zehntner, 1894

Species of praying mantis

Thesprotia macilenta, the Bolivian grass mantis, is a species of mantis found in Bolivia, Brazil, Costa Rica, Colombia, and Paraguay.
