= Thesprotia caribea =

Scientific classification
- Kingdom: Animalia
- Phylum: Arthropoda
- Clade: Pancrustacea
- Class: Insecta
- Order: Mantodea
- Family: Thespidae
- Genus: Thesprotia
- Species: T. caribea

Binomial name
- Thesprotia caribea Rehn & Hebard, 1938

Species of praying mantis

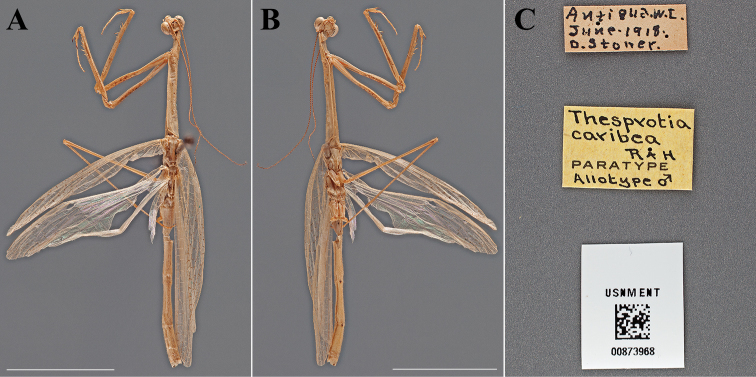
Thesprotia caribea

Thesprotia caribea is a species of praying mantis in the family Thespidae. It is endemic to Antigua.
