= Pseudomusonia rapax =

Scientific classification
- Domain: Eukaryota
- Kingdom: Animalia
- Phylum: Arthropoda
- Class: Insecta
- Order: Mantodea
- Family: Thespidae
- Genus: Pseudomusonia
- Species: P. rapax

Binomial name
- Pseudomusonia rapax Saussure & Zehntner, 1894

Species of praying mantis

Pseudomusonia rapax is a species of praying mantis native to Costa Rica and Venezuela.

== See also ==
- List of mantis genera and species
