= Oligonicella scudderi =

Scudder's mantis

Scientific classification
- Kingdom: Animalia
- Phylum: Arthropoda
- Clade: Pancrustacea
- Class: Insecta
- Order: Mantodea
- Family: Thespidae
- Genus: Oligonicella
- Species: O. scudderi

Binomial name
- Oligonicella scudderi Saussure (1870)

Synonyms
- Oligonicella missouriensis Glover, 1872; Oligonicella uhleri Stal, 1877

Species of praying mantis

Oligonicella scudderi, common name Scudder's mantis or slender prairie mantid, is a species of praying mantis native to the southern United States. It is a small brown insect; the males can fly but the females are wingless.

== Taxonomy ==
Oligonicella scudderi was first described in 1870 by the Swiss entomologist Henri Louis Frédéric de Saussure and named in honour of the American entomologist Samuel Hubbard Scudder from specimens found in Georgia. In 1894 another mantis Oligonyx bolliana was described from Dallas, Texas and from northern Mexico by Saussure and his collaborator, Leo Zehntner. In 1896, Scudder expressed the view that the two were the same species. Little further research has been done and many authorities now consider the two to be synonymous.

== Distribution ==
O. scudderi is found in the southern United States. Its range extends from the Great Plains and Nebraska, southwards to Texas and Mexico.

== Description ==
This is a small, pale brown, stick-like, ground-dwelling species of mantis that grows to a length of about 35 mm (1.4 in). The males are winged and are ready fliers, the wings being long enough to completely obscure the abdomen. The females have no wings and scuttle across the ground hunting prey.

== Biology ==
Male O. scudderi are sometimes caught in black light traps at night, and have been seen feeding on small flies, caddis flies and wasps. Females probably have a similar diet. When disturbed they tend to hide in tussocks of little bluestem grass (Schizachyrium scoparium) where their colouration makes them difficult to spot. They can best be caught by brushing a small-mesh net through the grass. As is the case with other mantis species, the eggs are laid in a clutch covered with foam which hardens into an egg case.
