= Bantia werneri =

Scientific classification
- Domain: Eukaryota
- Kingdom: Animalia
- Phylum: Arthropoda
- Class: Insecta
- Order: Mantodea
- Family: Thespidae
- Genus: Bantia
- Species: B. werneri

Binomial name
- Bantia werneri Chopard, 1913

Species of praying mantis

Bantia werneri is a species of praying mantis in the family Thespidae.

== See also ==
- List of mantis genera and species
