= Pseudomusonia lineativentris =

Scientific classification
- Kingdom: Animalia
- Phylum: Arthropoda
- Clade: Pancrustacea
- Class: Insecta
- Order: Mantodea
- Family: Thespidae
- Genus: Pseudomusonia
- Species: P. lineativentris

Binomial name
- Pseudomusonia lineativentris Stål, 1877

Species of praying mantis

Pseudomusonia lineativentris is a species of praying mantis native to Costa Rica, Colombia, and Panama.

== See also ==
- List of mantis genera and species
