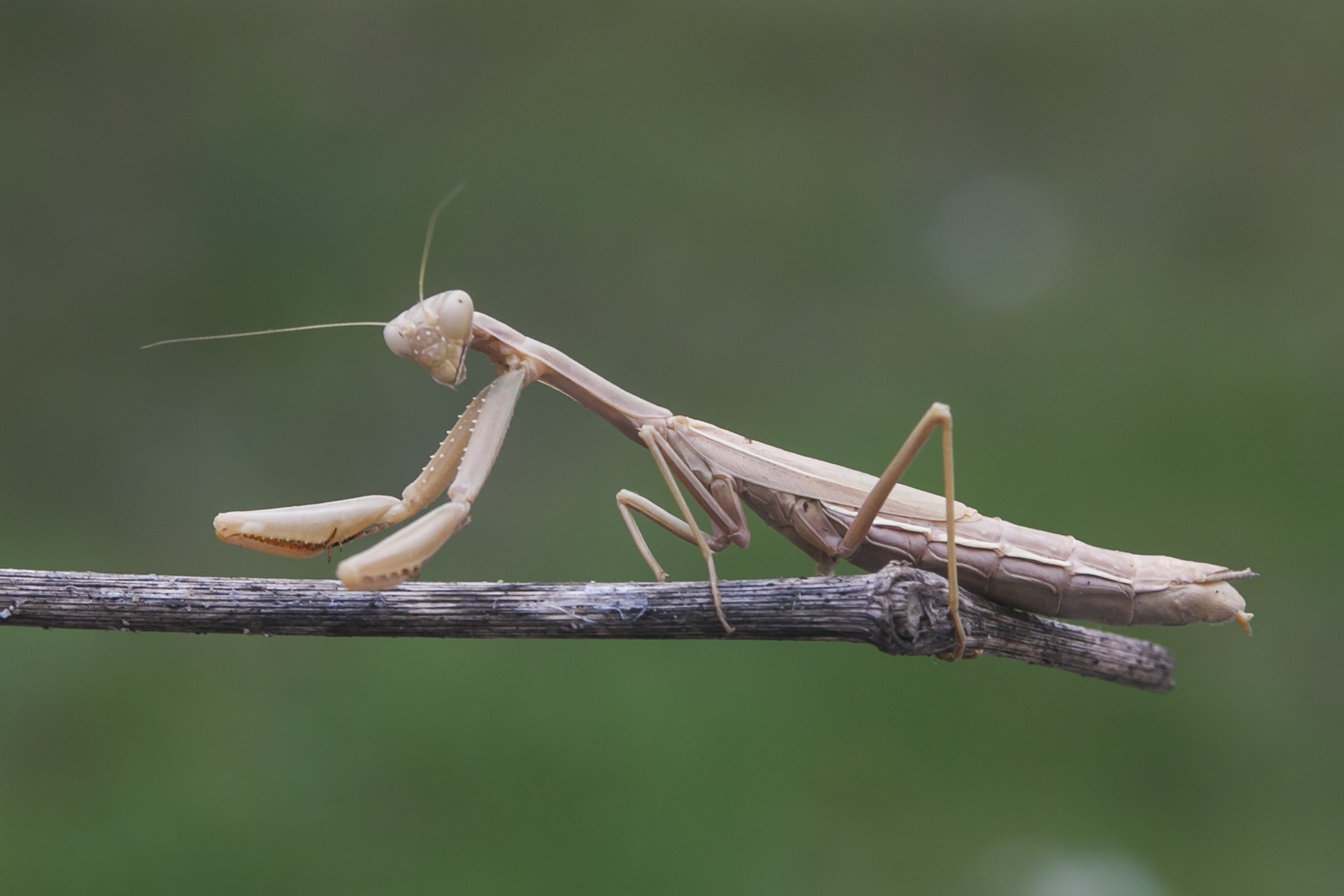
- Iris polystictica (female)

Scientific classification
- Kingdom: Animalia
- Phylum: Arthropoda
- Clade: Pancrustacea
- Class: Insecta
- Order: Mantodea
- Family: Eremiaphilidae
- Genus: Iris
- Species: I. polystictica

Binomial name
- Iris polystictica (Fischer-Walheim, 1846)

Subspecies
- See text

Synonyms
- Mantis polystictica (Fischer-Walheim, 1846); Iris tiflisina (Giglio-Tos, 1915)

= Iris polystictica =

Species of praying mantis

Dot-winged Mantis (Iris polystictica) is a species of praying mantis found in Central Asia, Caucasus, southeastern Ukraine, southern Siberia, China, and Mongolia. It is the only species of the mantis genus Iris that is found in Russia.

== Description ==
About 28-49mm in length.

== Subspecies ==
- Iris polystictica polystictica (Fischer-Waldheim, 1846) Afghanistan, China, Iran, Tadschikistan, Transcaucasus, Turkmenistan, Turkestan
- Iris polystictica mongolica (Sjostedt, 1932) Mongolia, China
- Iris polystictica shahdarinica (Lindt, 1963) Tadschikistan
- Iris polystictica shugnanica (Lindt, 1963) Tadschikistan

== See also ==
- List of mantis genera and species
- Iris oratoria
