= Bantia marmorata =

Scientific classification
- Domain: Eukaryota
- Kingdom: Animalia
- Phylum: Arthropoda
- Class: Insecta
- Order: Mantodea
- Family: Thespidae
- Genus: Bantia
- Species: B. marmorata

Binomial name
- Bantia marmorata Saussure & Zehntner, 1894

Species of praying mantis

Bantia marmorata is a species of praying mantis in the family Thespidae.

== See also ==
- List of mantis genera and species
