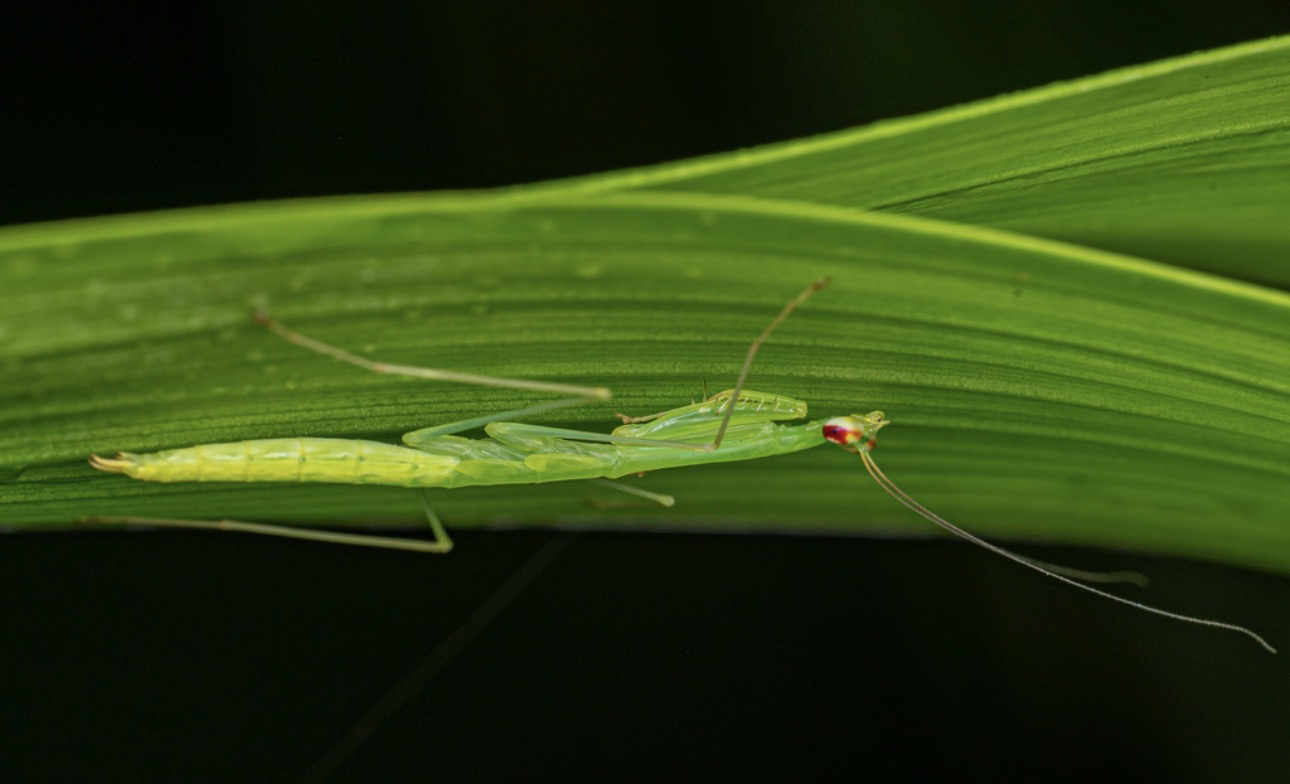
- Aetaella pluvisilvae in Sinharaja Forest Reserve

Scientific classification
- Kingdom: Animalia
- Phylum: Arthropoda
- Clade: Pancrustacea
- Class: Insecta
- Order: Mantodea
- Family: Leptomantellidae
- Genus: Aetaella; Hebard, 1920

= Aetaella =

Genus of insects

Aetaella is a genus of praying mantids, in the family Leptomantellidae. It has previously been placed as a subgenus of Leptomantella and species in this group have been recorded from Asia; especially Philippines and Sri Lanka.

== Species ==
The Mantodea Species File lists:

1. Aetaella bakeri Hebard, 1920 - type species (Philippines)
2. Aetaella pluvisilvae Henry, 1931 (Sri Lanka)
