= Iris senegalensis =

Scientific classification
- Kingdom: Animalia
- Phylum: Arthropoda
- Clade: Pancrustacea
- Class: Insecta
- Order: Mantodea
- Family: Eremiaphilidae
- Genus: Iris
- Species: I. senegalensis

Binomial name
- Iris senegalensis (Beier, 1931)

Synonyms
- Iris longicollis (Chopard, 1940)

Species of praying mantis

Iris senegalensis is a species of praying mantis found in Burkina Faso, Chad, Mauritania, Niger, and Senegal. It was first described by Max Beier in 1931.

== See also ==
- List of mantis genera and species
