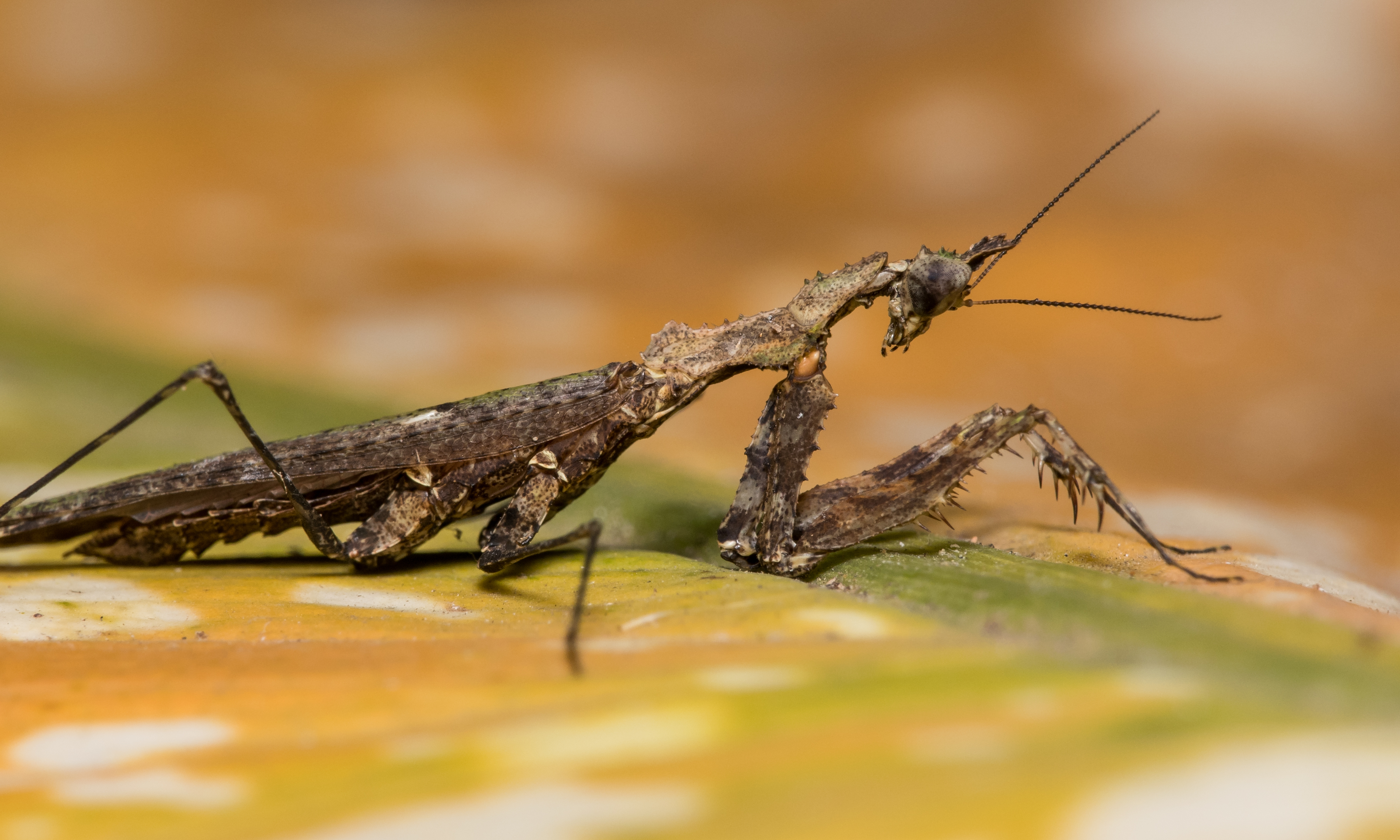
- Haania sp.

Scientific classification
- Kingdom: Animalia
- Phylum: Arthropoda
- Clade: Pancrustacea
- Class: Insecta
- Superorder: Dictyoptera
- Order: Mantodea
- Family: Haaniidae
- Subfamily: Haaniinae; Giglio-Tos, 1915

= Haaniinae =

Subfamily of praying mantises

Haaniinae is a subfamily of mantises, in the family Haaniidae. The included species are found in Asia.

== Tribes and genera ==
The Mantodea Species File lists two tribes:

- Tribe Arriini
  - Arria Stal, 1877
  - Sinomiopteryx Tinkham, 1937
- Tribe Haaniini
  - Astape Stal, 1877
  - Haania Saussure, 1871
