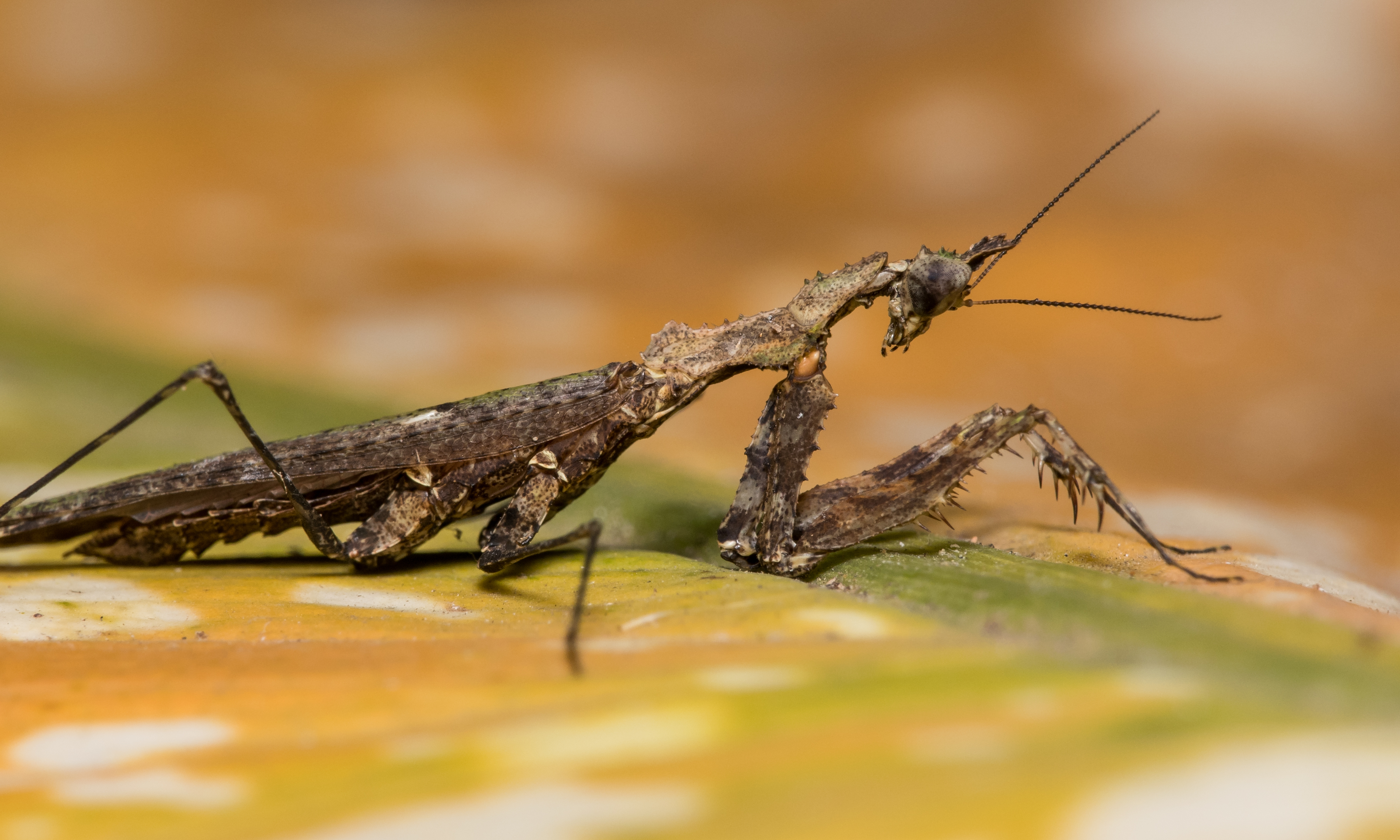
- Haania sp. from Cát Tiên National Park

Scientific classification
- Kingdom: Animalia
- Phylum: Arthropoda
- Clade: Pancrustacea
- Class: Insecta
- Order: Mantodea
- Family: Haaniidae
- Subfamily: Haaniinae
- Genus: Haania; Saussure, 1871

Synonyms
- Ceratohaania Tinkham, 1937; Hystricomantis Werner, 1922; Parairidopteryx Saussure, 1871

= Haania =

Genus of praying mantises

Haania is the type genus of Asian praying mantids in the new (2019) family Haaniidae. They are recorded from: southern China (Hainan), Indo-China and the Philippines.

== Species ==
The Mantodea Species File and Tree of Life list:

1. Haania aspera Werner, 1922
2. Haania borneana Beier, 1952
3. Haania confusa Kirby, 1904
4. Haania dispar Werner, 1922
5. Haania doroshenkoi Anisyutkin & Gorochov, 2004
6. Haania lobiceps de Haan, 1842 - type species
7. Haania orlovi Anisyutkin, 2005
8. Haania philippina Giglio-Tos, 1915
9. Haania simplex Beier, 1952
10. Haania vitalisi Chopard, 1920
