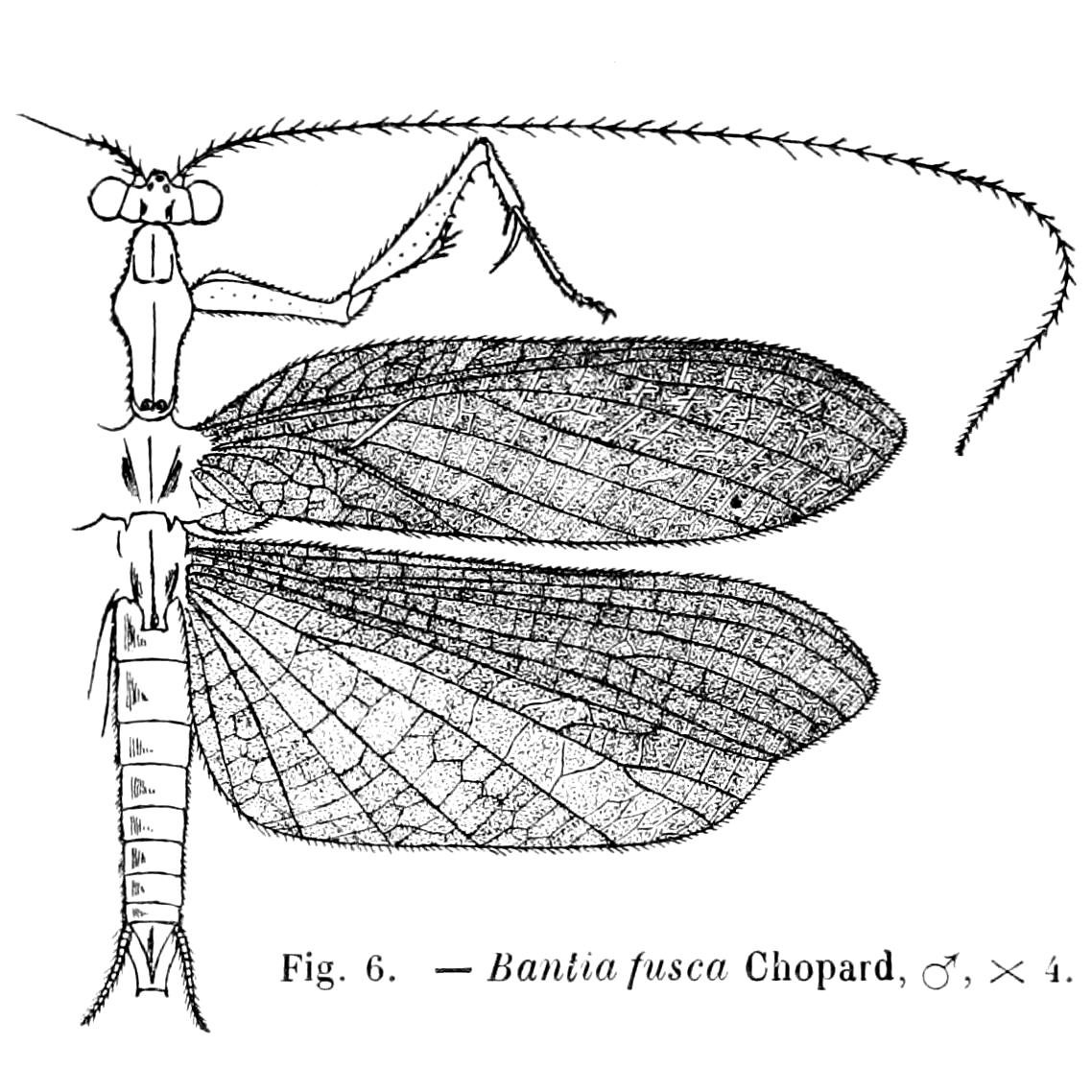
- Bantia fusca

Scientific classification
- Kingdom: Animalia
- Phylum: Arthropoda
- Clade: Pancrustacea
- Class: Insecta
- Order: Mantodea
- Family: Thespidae
- Subfamily: Bantiinae
- Genus: Bantia; Stål, 1877

Synonyms
- Eubantia Giglio-Tos, 1915; Mionicella Giglio-Tos, 1915

= Bantia (mantis) =

Genus of praying mantises

Bantia is a genus of mantises in the family Thespidae.

== Species ==
- Bantia chopardi Giglio-Tos, 1915
- Bantia fusca Chopard, 1911
- Bantia marmorata Saussure & Zehntner, 1894
- Bantia metzi Beier, 1935
- Bantia michaelisi Beier, 1935
- Bantia nana Toledo Piza, 1969
- Bantia pygmaea Saussure, 1872
- Bantia simoni Chopard, 1916
- Bantia werneri Chopard, 1913
- Bantia yotocoensis Salazar, 2004

== See also ==
- List of mantis genera and species
