= Arria (mantis) =

Scientific classification
- Kingdom: Animalia
- Phylum: Arthropoda
- Clade: Pancrustacea
- Class: Insecta
- Order: Mantodea
- Family: Haaniidae
- Subfamily: Haaniinae
- Tribe: Arriini
- Genus: Arria (mantis); Stål, 1877

Genus of praying mantises

Arria is a genus of Asian praying mantids in the family Haaniidae. They are recorded from: China and Indo-China.

== Species ==
After Mantodea Species File.

- Arria cinctipes Stål, 1877
- Arria leigongshanensis (Ge & Chen, 2008)
- Arria meghalayensis Mukherjee, 1995
- Arria muscoamicta Unnahachote & Shcherbakov, 2021
- Arria oreophila Tinkham, 1937
- Arria pallida Zhang, 1987
- Arria pura Wang, Yang, Yersin, Ye & Chen, 2021
- Arria qinlingensis Wu, Zhang & Liu, 2024
- Arria stanleyi Chao, 2025
- Arria sticta Zhou & Shen, 1992
