= Thespis (mantis) =

Scientific classification
- Kingdom: Animalia
- Phylum: Arthropoda
- Clade: Pancrustacea
- Class: Insecta
- Order: Mantodea
- Family: Thespidae
- Subfamily: Thespinae
- Genus: Thespis; Serville, 1831

Synonyms
- Diamusonia Giglio-Tos, 1916

Genus of praying mantises

Thespis is a genus of mantis in the family Thespidae.

The following species are recognised in the genus Thespis:

- Thespis bicolor Chopard, 1913
- Thespis dissimilis Westwood, 1889
- Thespis exposita Beier, 1963
- Thespis major Giglio-Tos, 1916
- Thespis media Giglio-Tos, 1916
- Thespis metae Hebard, 1922
- Thespis parva Drury, 1773

== See also ==
- List of mantis genera and species
