= Thesprotia (mantis) =

- Thesprotia infumata

Scientific classification
- Kingdom: Animalia
- Phylum: Arthropoda
- Clade: Pancrustacea
- Class: Insecta
- Order: Mantodea
- Family: Thespidae
- Subfamily: Thespinae
- Tribe: Oligonychini
- Subtribe: Oligonychina
- Genus: Thesprotia; Stål, 1877

Genus of praying mantises

Thesprotia is a genus of mantises commonly known as grass mantis. They are native to the Americas and are represented by the following species:

- Thesprotia brasiliensis (Brazilian grass mantis)
- Thesprotia brevis
- Thesprotia caribea (Caribbean grass mantis)
- Thesprotia filum
- Thesprotia fuscipennis
- Thesprotia gigas
- Thesprotia graminis (American grass mantis)
- Thesprotia infumata
- Thesprotia insolita
- Thesprotia macilenta
- Thesprotia maculata
- Thesprotia pellucida
- Thesprotia simplex
- Thesprotia subhyalina

== See also ==
- Grass mantis
- List of mantis genera and species
