= Iris narzykulovi =

Scientific classification
- Kingdom: Animalia
- Phylum: Arthropoda
- Clade: Pancrustacea
- Class: Insecta
- Order: Mantodea
- Family: Eremiaphilidae
- Genus: Iris
- Species: I. narzykulovi

Binomial name
- Iris narzykulovi Lindt, 1960

Species of praying mantis

Iris narzykulovi is a species of praying mantis found in Tajikistan.

== See also ==
- List of mantis genera and species
