= Diabantia =

Scientific classification
- Kingdom: Animalia
- Phylum: Arthropoda
- Clade: Pancrustacea
- Class: Insecta
- Order: Mantodea
- Family: Thespidae
- Subfamily: Bantiinae
- Genus: Diabantia; Giglio-Tos, 1915

Genus of praying mantises

Diabantia is a genus of praying mantises in the family Thespidae. It is monotypic, being represented by the single species, Diabantia minima.

== See also ==
- List of mantis genera and species
