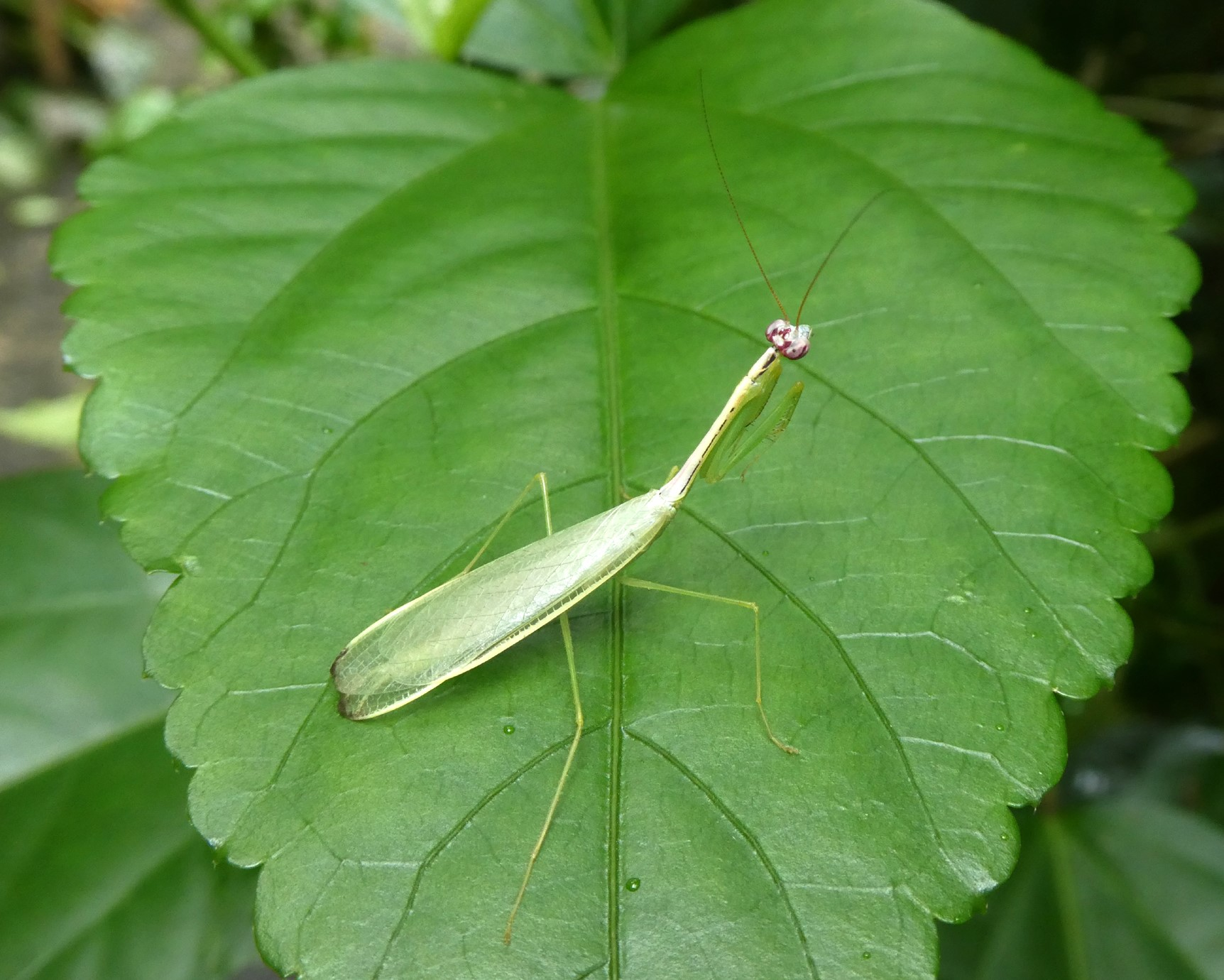
- Leptomantella cf. tonkinae, Vietnam

Scientific classification
- Kingdom: Animalia
- Phylum: Arthropoda
- Clade: Pancrustacea
- Class: Insecta
- Order: Mantodea
- Clade: Nanomantodea
- Superfamily: Nanomantoidea
- Family: Leptomantellidae; Schwarz & Roy, 2019

= Leptomantellidae =

Family of praying mantises

The Leptomantellidae are a new (2019), small family of praying mantids, based on the type genus Leptomantella. As part of a major revision of mantid taxonomy, genera have been moved here from the Caliridinae in the now obsolete family Tarachodidae.

The new placement is in superfamily Nanomantoidea (of group Cernomantodea) and infraorder Schizomantodea. Species in this family have been recorded from Asia, including India and Indochina.

== Genera ==
The Mantodea Species File lists:

1. Aetaella Hebard, 1920
2. Hebardia - monotypic H. pellucida Werner, 1921
3. Hebardiella Werner, 1924
4. Leptomantella Uvarov, 1940
