= Paradiabantia =

Paradiabantia perparva

Scientific classification
- Domain: Eukaryota
- Kingdom: Animalia
- Phylum: Arthropoda
- Class: Insecta
- Order: Mantodea
- Family: Thespidae
- Genus: Paradiabantia; Toledo Piza, 1973
- Species: P. perparva

Binomial name
- Paradiabantia perparva Toledo Piza, 1973

Synonyms
- Diabantia perparva Toledo Piza, 1973

Genus of praying mantises

Paradiabantia is a monotypic genus of praying mantises in the family Thespidae. It is represented by the single species, Paradiabantia perparva.

== See also ==
- List of mantis genera and species
