= Carrikerella =

Scientific classification
- Kingdom: Animalia
- Phylum: Arthropoda
- Clade: Pancrustacea
- Class: Insecta
- Order: Mantodea
- Family: Thespidae
- Subtribe: Pogonogasterina
- Genus: Carrikerella; Hebard, 1921

Species
- Carrikerella ceratophora; Carrikerella empusa; Carrikerella simpira

Genus of praying mantises

Carrikerella is a genus of mantis in the family Thespidae.

== See also ==
- List of mantis genera and species
