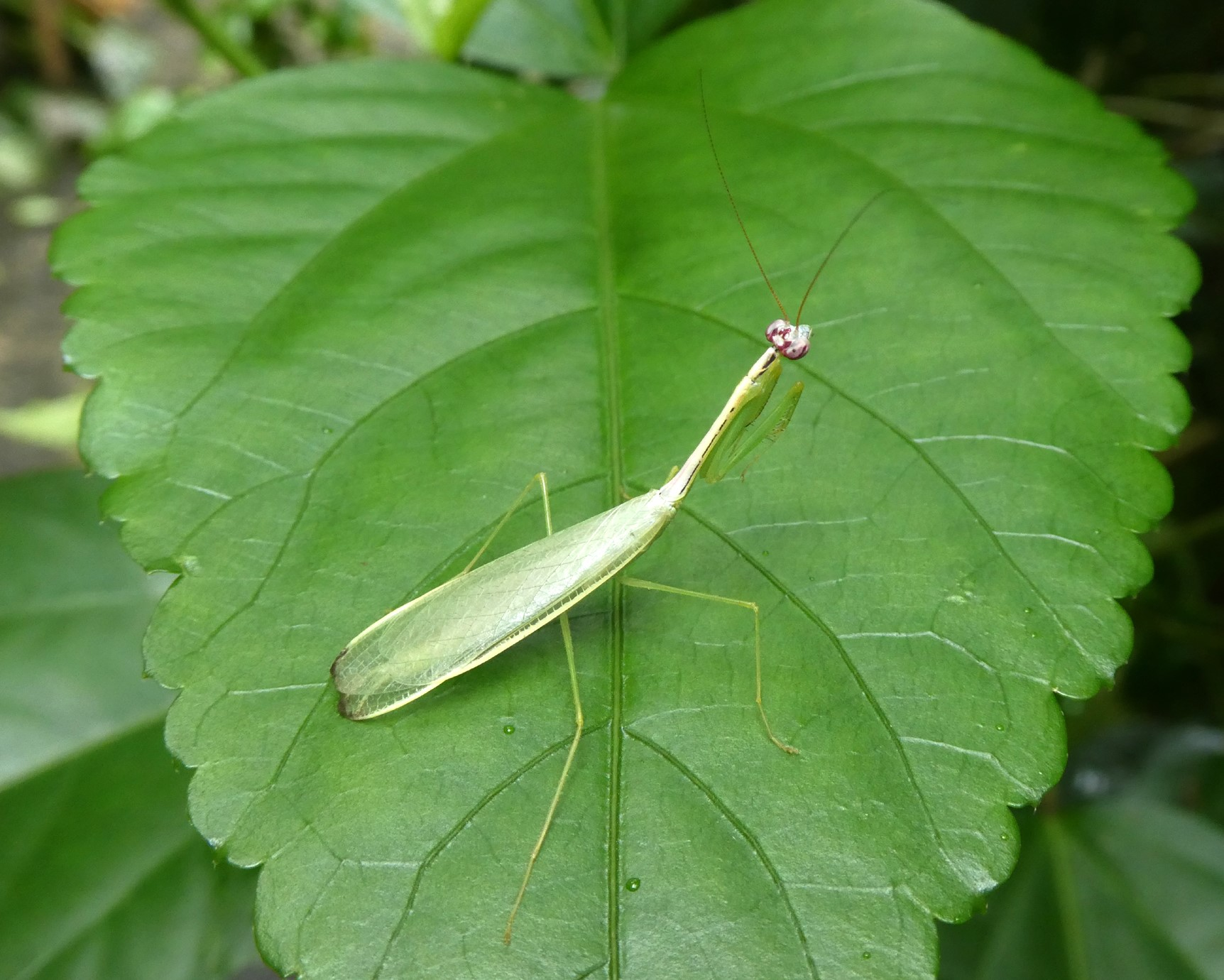
- Leptomantella cf. tonkinae found in Cát Tiên National Park

Scientific classification
- Kingdom: Animalia
- Phylum: Arthropoda
- Clade: Pancrustacea
- Class: Insecta
- Superorder: Dictyoptera
- Order: Mantodea
- Family: Leptomantellidae
- Genus: Leptomantella; Burmeister, 1838

Synonyms
- Leptomantis Giglio-Tos, 1915

= Leptomantella =

Genus of praying mantises

Leptomantella is a genus of praying mantids and typical of the new (2019) family Leptomantellidae. Species have been recorded from Asia.

Previously placed here as a subgenus, the genus Aetaella was erected by Hebard in 1920 and has now been restored.

== Species ==
The Mantodea Species File lists:

- Leptomantella albella (Burmeister, 1838) - type species (as Mantis albella Burmeister)
- Leptomantella ceylonica Beier, 1956
- Leptomantella fragilis Westwood, 1889
- Leptomantella indica Giglio-Tos, 1915
- Leptomantella lactea Saussure, 1870
- Leptomantella montana Beier, 1942
- Leptomantella nigrocoxata Mukherjee, 1995
- Leptomantella parva Uvarov, 1933
- Leptomantella tonkinae Hebard, 1920
- Leptomantella xizangensis Wang, 1993
