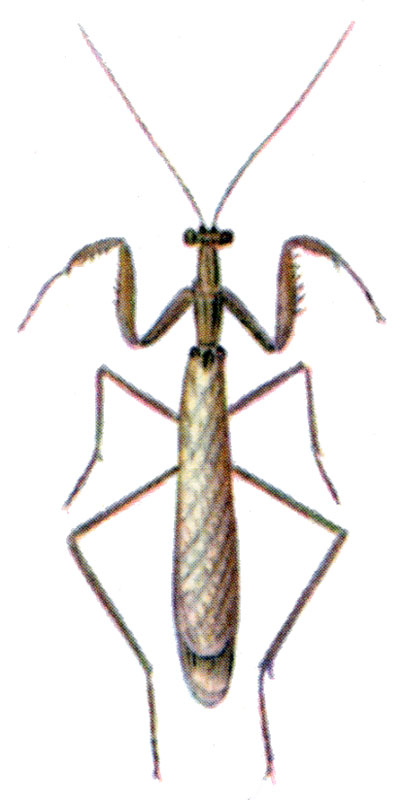
- Oligonicella bolliana

Scientific classification
- Kingdom: Animalia
- Phylum: Arthropoda
- Clade: Pancrustacea
- Class: Insecta
- Order: Mantodea
- Family: Thespidae
- Subtribe: Oligonychina
- Genus: Oligonicella; Giglio-Tos, 1915

Species
- see text

= Oligonicella =

Genus of praying mantises

Oligonicella is a wide-ranging genus of mantises in the family Thespidae. It is represented in Africa, Asia, Europe, and North America.

== Species ==
Species in the genus include:

1. O. bolliana
2. O. brunneri — Europe.
3. O. punctulata
4. O. scudderi — North America. - type species (as Oligonicella scudderi Saussure)
5. O. striolata
6. O. tessellata

== See also ==
- List of mantis genera and species
