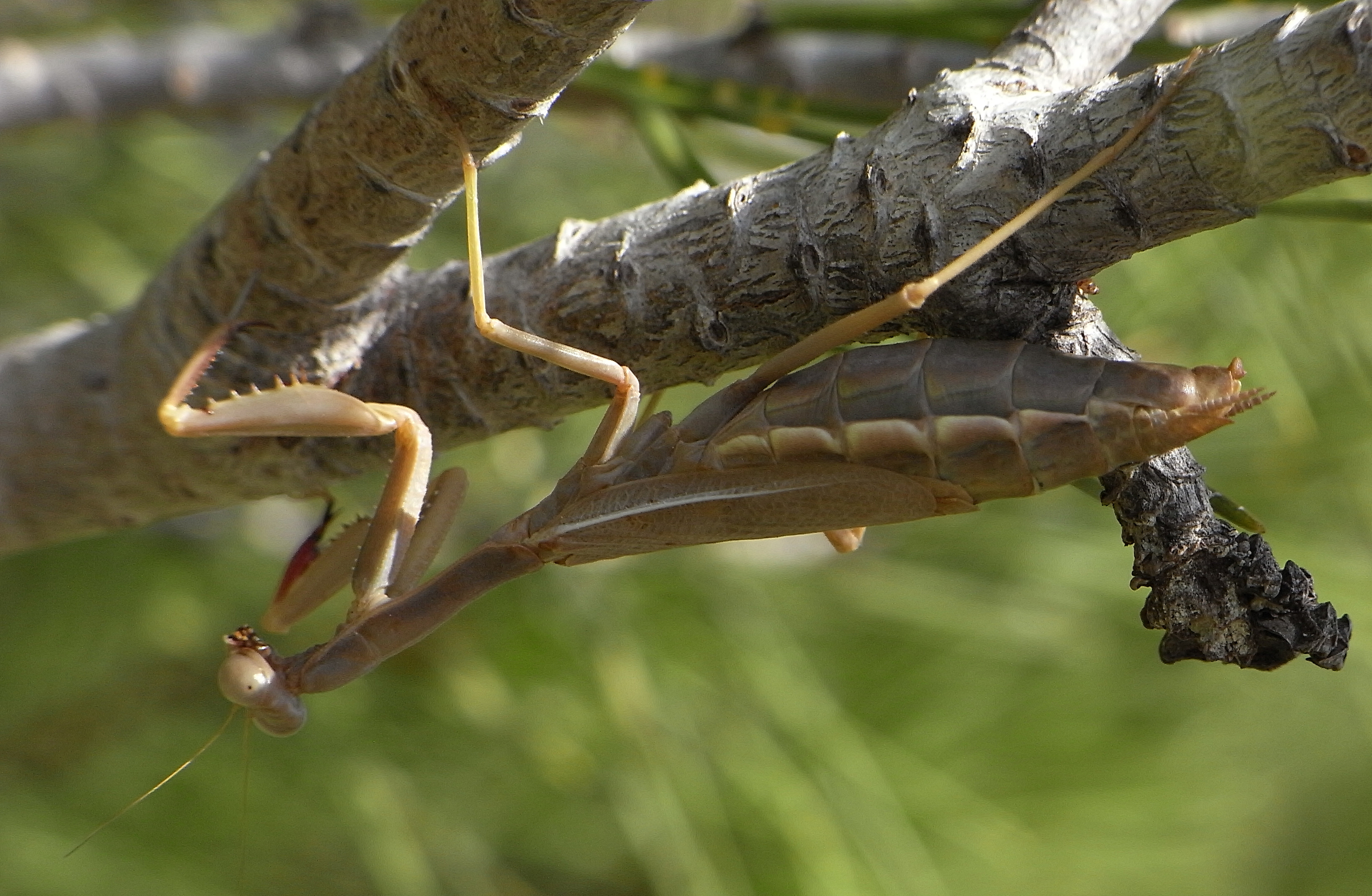
- Adult female Iris oratoria

Conservation status
- Least Concern (IUCN 3.1)

Scientific classification
- Kingdom: Animalia
- Phylum: Arthropoda
- Clade: Pancrustacea
- Class: Insecta
- Order: Mantodea
- Family: Eremiaphilidae
- Genus: Iris
- Species: I. oratoria

Binomial name
- Iris oratoria (Linnaeus, 1758)

Synonyms
- Gryllus (Mantis) oratorius Linnaeus, 1758; Mantis bella (Germar,1817); Mantis dentata (Goeze, 1778); Mantis fenestrata (Brullé, 1832); Mantis minima (Charpentier, 1825)

= Iris oratoria =

Species of praying mantis

Iris oratoria, known by the common name Mediterranean mantis (or less frequently iris mantis), due to humans first studying it in lands around the Mediterranean Sea, is a species of praying mantis. Its range is expanding in the Middle East, Western Asia and the United States.

== Range ==
Albania, Bulgaria, Brač Island, Korčula Island, France (Including Corsica), Greece (Including Ionian Islands, Crete, Cyclades Islands), Italy (Including Sardinia, Sicily), North Macedonia, Portugal, Spain (Including Balearic Islands), Yugoslavia (Including Serbia, Kosovo, Voivodina, Montenegro), North Africa (Morocco, Algeria, Tunisia, Libya, Egypt, North Chad), Cyprus, West, Central and South Asia (Asian Turkey, India, Israel, Iran, Jordan, Lebanon, Pakistan, Palestine, Syria, Turkestan), Non-native to the Southwestern United States (Arizona, California, Nevada, Texas.).

== Appearance ==
I. oratoria is very pale when young but matures to grass green, and grows to about 6.5 cm (2.6 in) long. The species may be distinguished from Mantis religiosa and other mantids with which it shares a range and general size and shape by the red-orange spot on the ventral side of the fourth (second to last) abdominal segment; also, its cerci are shorter than those of M. religiosa. The species is distinctive in having two large startling violet-brown eyespots on its hind wings which are revealed when its wings are unfolded. The adult is more slender than Tenodera sinensis, more like Mantis religiosa in shape. Females have wings shorter than the abdomen, very similar to some Stagmomantis species, but easily distinguished if the hindwings are visible.

== Reproduction ==
Two novel I. oratoria survival strategies may have contributed to the expansion of this species beyond its original range, and its success in areas formerly occupied by other mantids such as Stagmomantis carolina. Firstly, this species is capable of parthenogenic reproduction when males are scarce. Secondly, additional I. oratoria nymphs may emerge from their oothecae in the second season after the egg case is produced, i.e., when their siblings are already grown and are producing their own offspring.

=== Hatching ===
At a field site in Davis, California, S. limbata hatched earlier in the season than Iris oratoria, and Iris oratoria tended to persist longer into the year.

== Behaviour ==
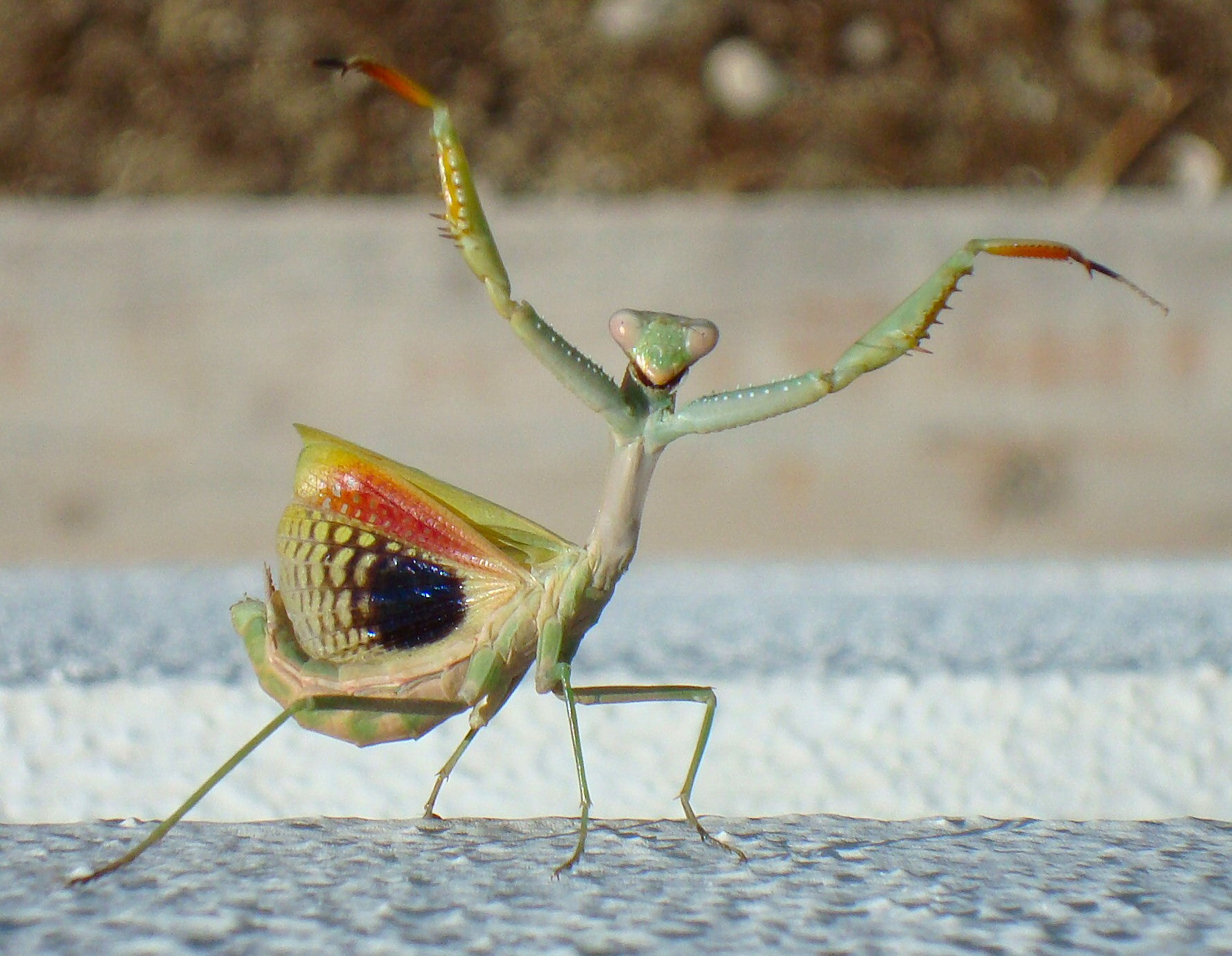
An adult female Iris oratoria in a deimatic or threat pose

The Mediterranean mantis is known for two distinctive behaviours, apart from the ambush hunting common to other mantids: cannibalism and deimatic or threat displays. The sexual cannibalism of mantids known in popular culture occurs in roughly one quarter of all intersexual encounters of I. oratoria.

When the mantis is under attack, it sets in motion a complex series of actions which combine to form a startling deimatic display. The mantis turns to face the aggressor, rears up by arching its back, curls its abdomen upwards (dorsiflexion), raises and waves its forelimbs, raises its wings to displays the large brightly coloured eyespots on the hindwings, and stridulates by scraping the edge of its hindwings against its tegmina, the leathery front wings.

=== Diet ===
Compared to Stagmomantis limbata, Iris oratoria eats a lesser portion of Orthopteran insects and does not eat as much long bodied insects. S. limbata adults have longer pronota and forelegs than I. oratoria adults. This difference in body size might be an important cause of the dietary differences between the species. Furthermore, the earlier hatch date for S. limbata also might reduce the overlap in Iris oratoria and Stagmomantis limbata diets.

== Gallery ==
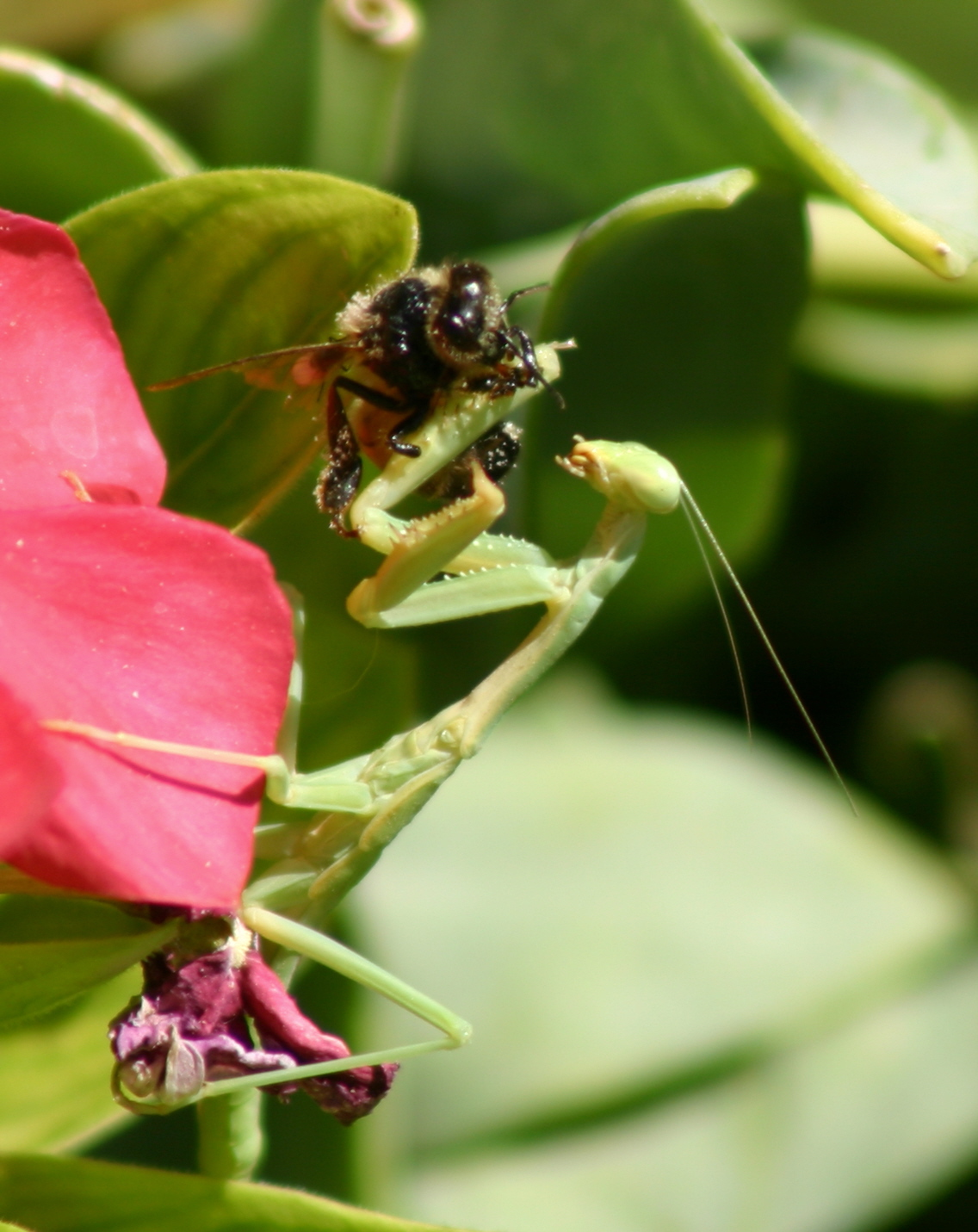
Iris oratoria eating a bee

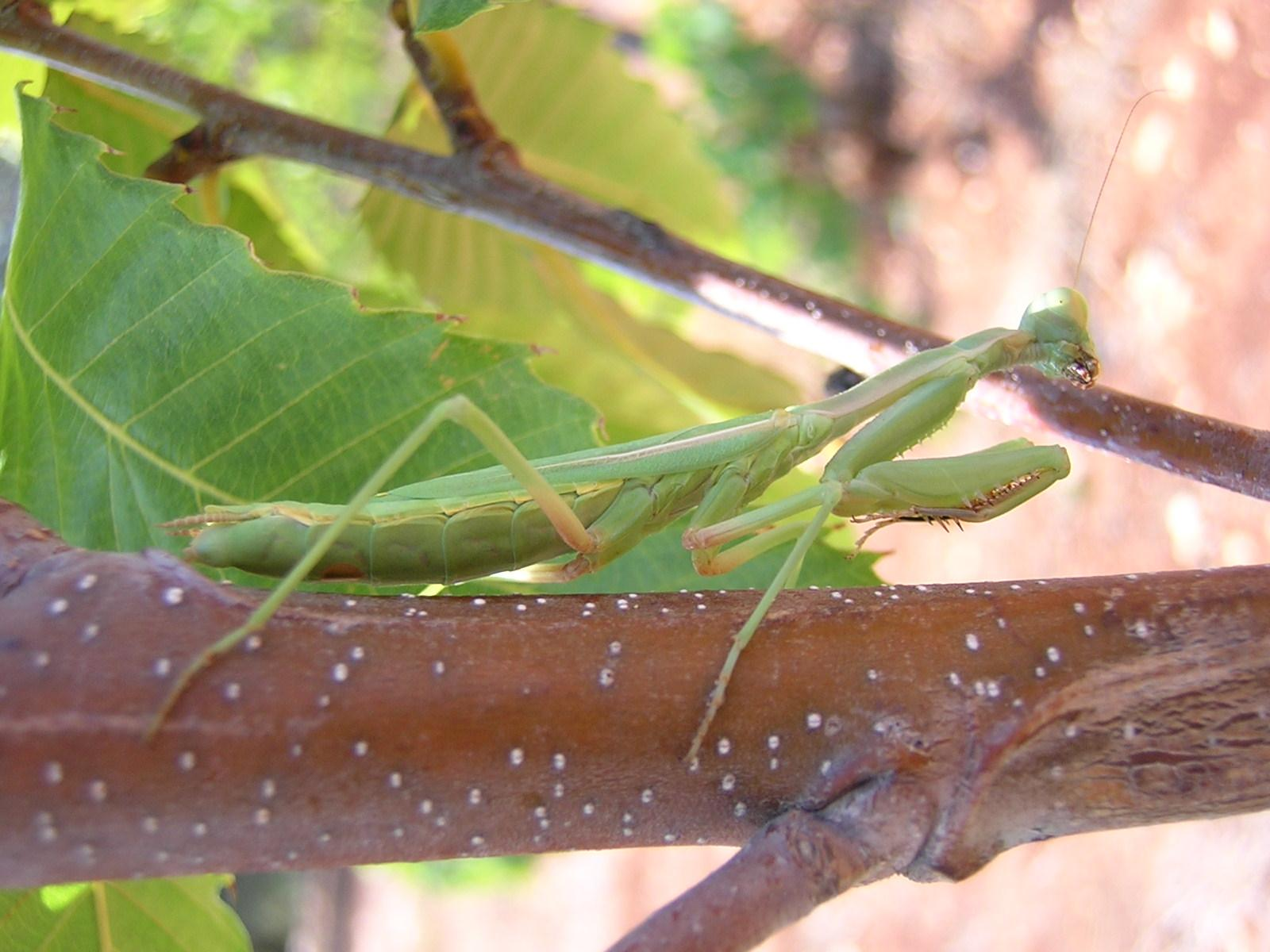
Iris oratoria adult female

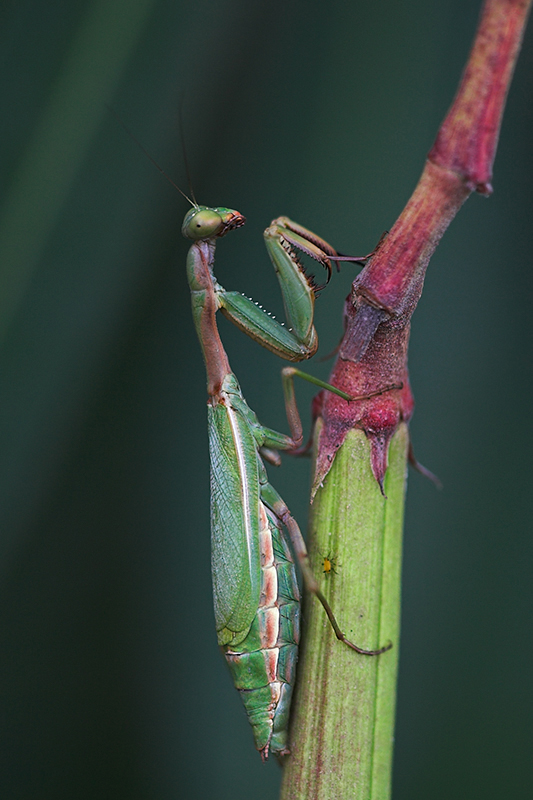
Adult female

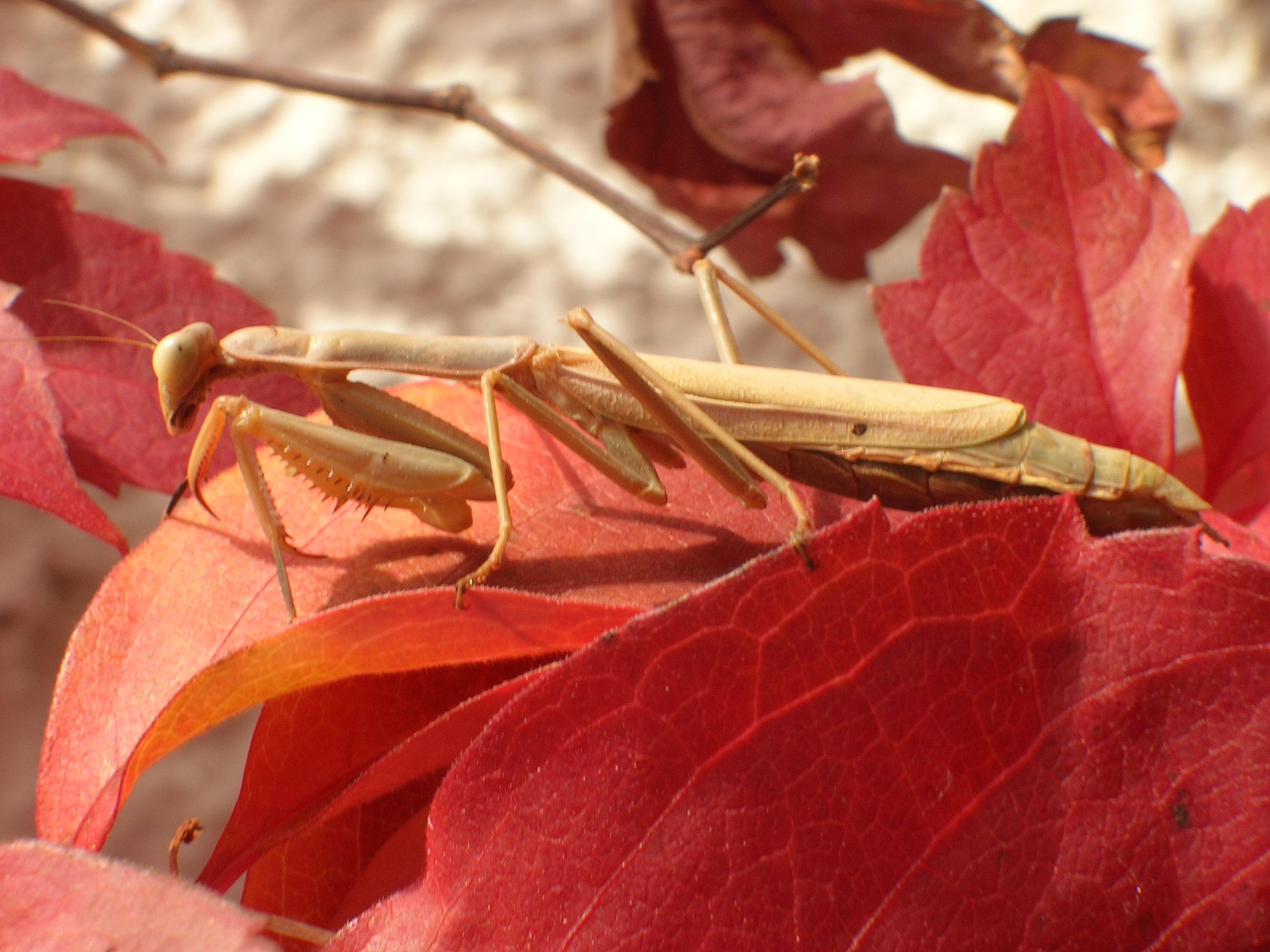
Adult female Iris oratoria from Sierra de la Alpujarra, Spain

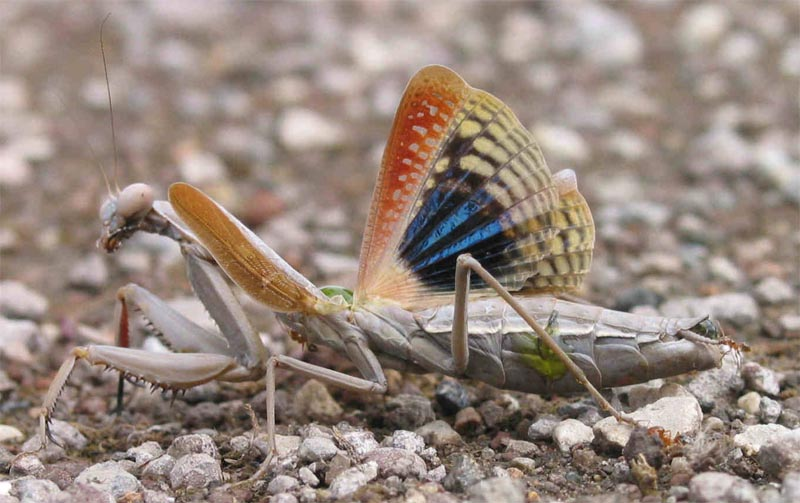
Adult female Iris oratoria

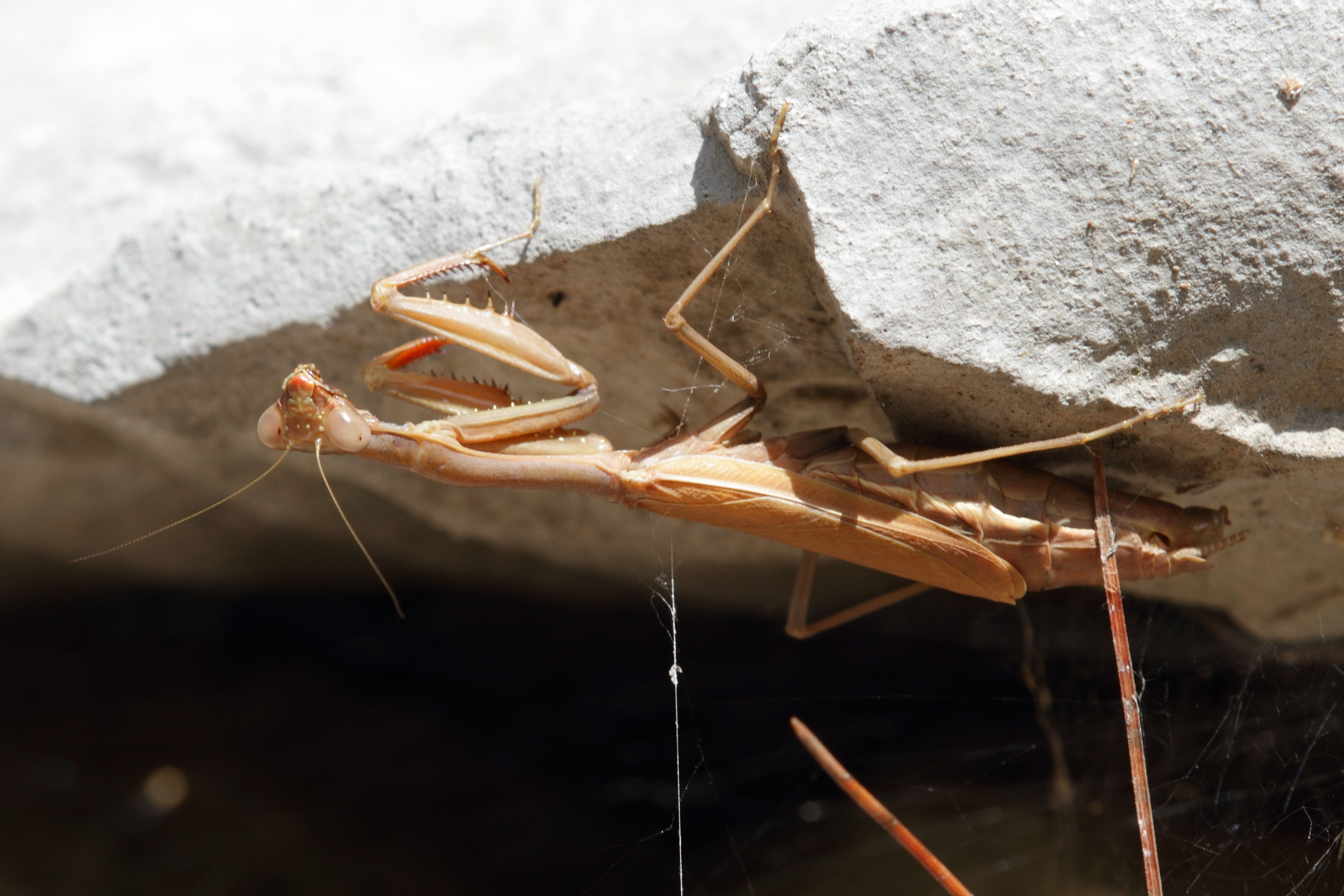
Adult female Iris oratoria from Hvar

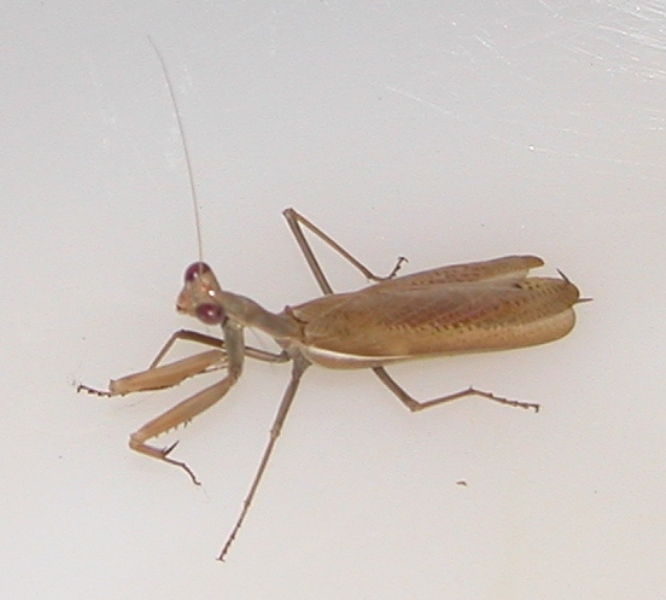
Adult male Iris oratoria from Jerusalem

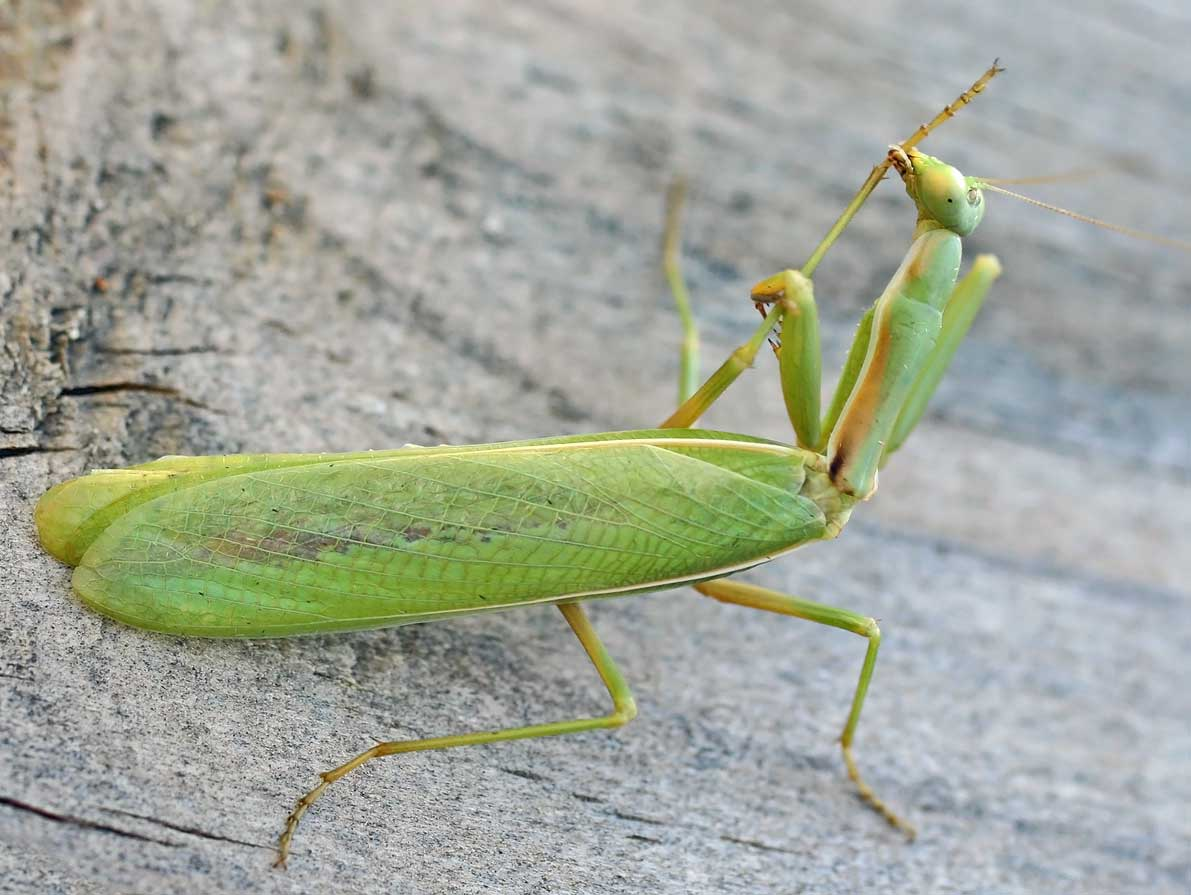
Adult male Iris oratoria

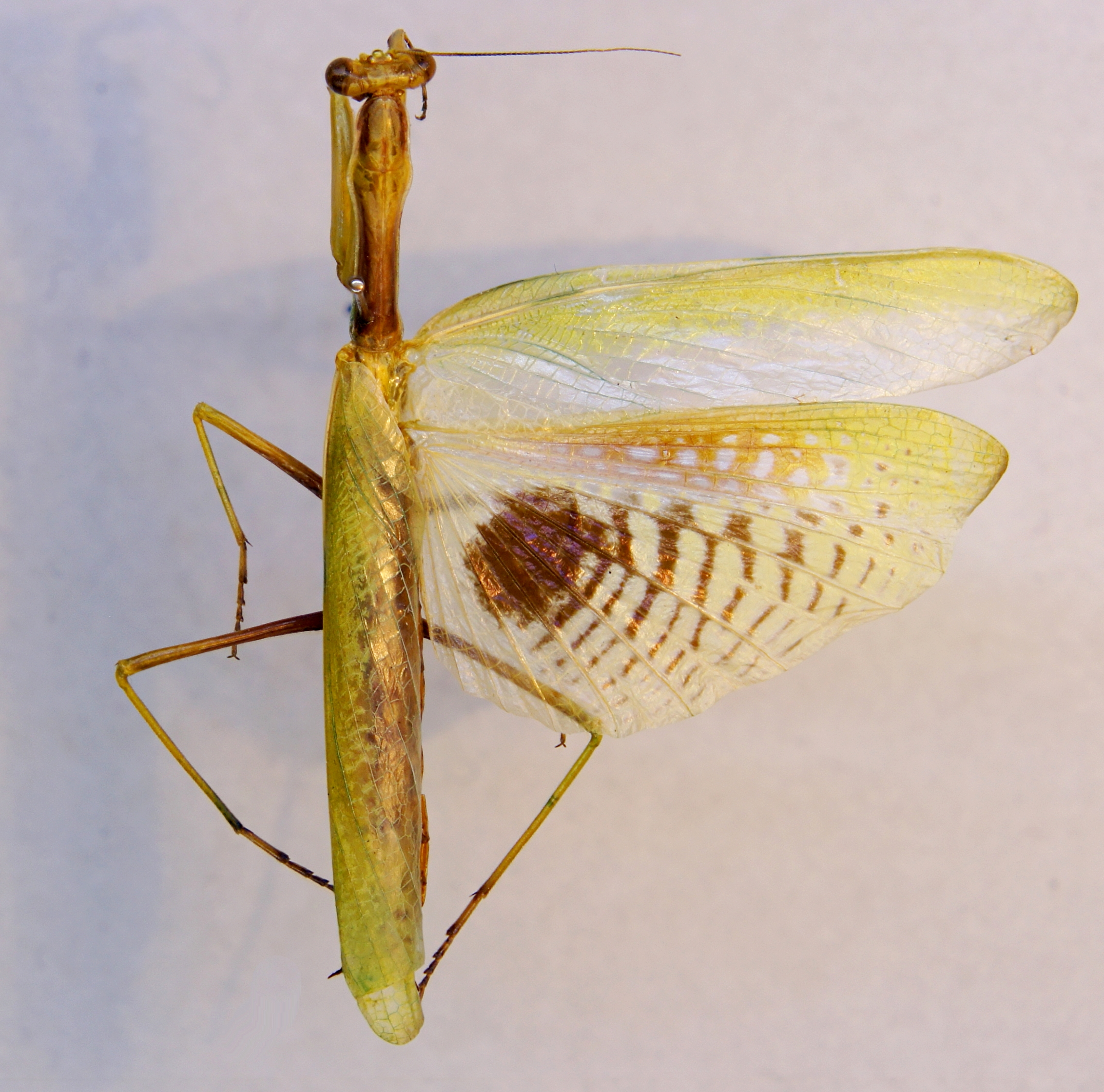
Iris oratoria from Zoologische Staatssammlung München

== See also ==
- Stagmomantis
- Pseudomantis albofimbriata
- List of mantis genera and species

== Bibliography ==
- Crump, Marty (2005). Headless Males Make Great Lovers & Other Unusual Natural Histories. Illustrated by Crump, Alan. University of Chicago Press. ISBN 0-226-12199-2.
- Prete, Frederick R.; Wells, Harrington; Wells, Patrick H.; Hurd, Lawrence E. (1999). The Praying Mantids. JHU Press. ISBN 978-0-8018-6174-1.
