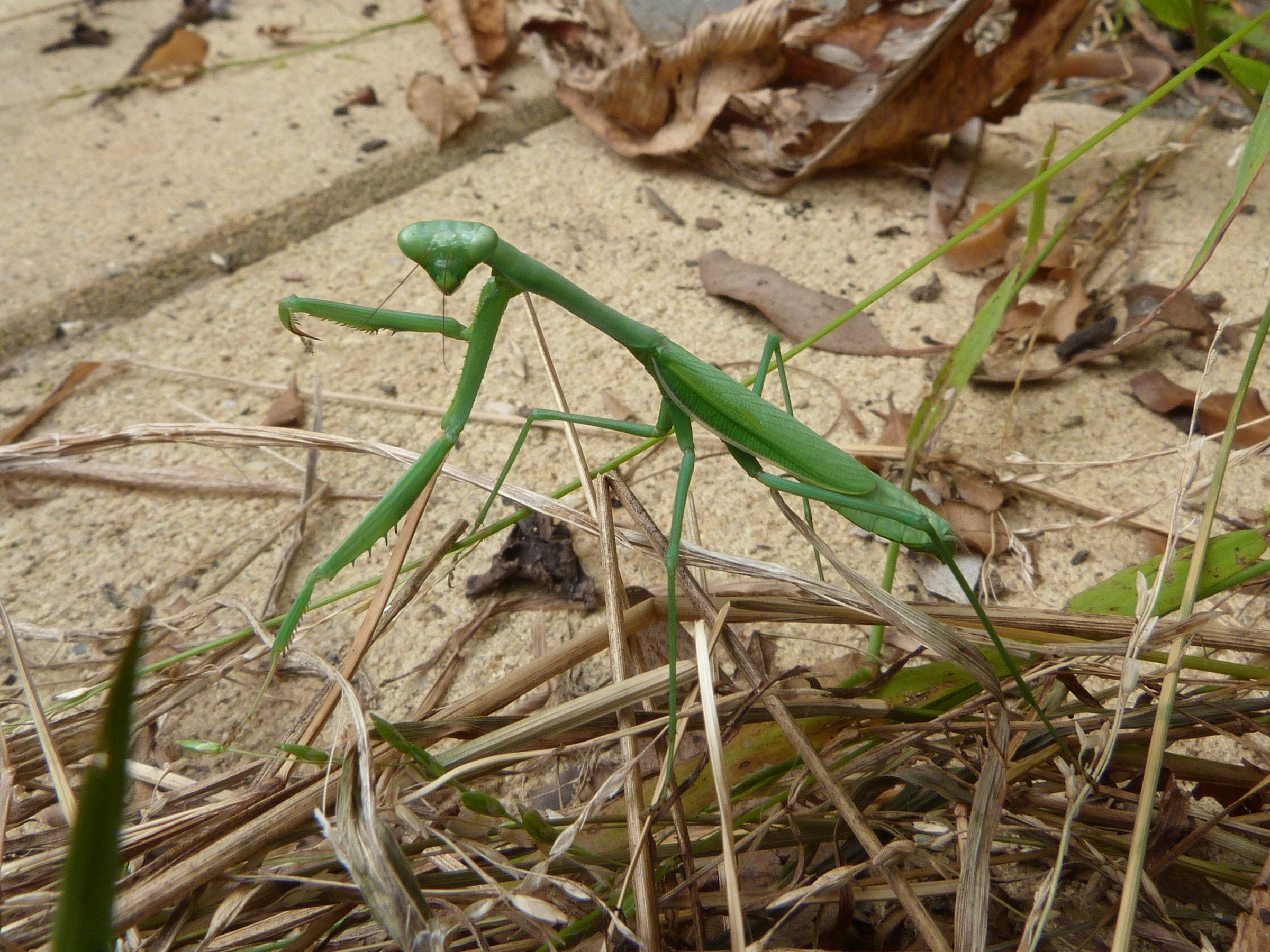

Scientific classification
- Kingdom: Animalia
- Phylum: Arthropoda
- Clade: Pancrustacea
- Class: Insecta
- Order: Mantodea
- Family: Mantidae
- Genus: Pseudomantis
- Species: P. albofimbriata

Binomial name
- Pseudomantis albofimbriata (Stål, 1860)

Synonyms
- Mantis albofimbriata Stål, 1860

= False garden mantis =

Species of praying mantis

The false garden mantis (Pseudomantis albofimbriata) is a species of praying mantis in the family Mantidae, and was first described in 1860 by Carl Stål as Mantis albofimbriata. Females reach 70 mm while males reach 50 mm.

== Identification/distribution ==
The false garden mantis is either green or brown but rarely may come in other colours such as purple-reddish-brown but mostly in green.

They have a distinctive dark spot on the femur of each raptorial foreleg. Females have short wings that only cover half of the abdomen, whereas males have wings that cover the full length of the abdomen. Males sometimes have yellow triangular markings on the underside of the abdomen. They are most commonly found in New South Wales and Queensland, but can be found in limited numbers in every Australian state, including Tasmania. Despite this, over half of the records of the species on iNaturalist are from Victoria. They live in urban areas as well as forests and woodlands.

== Behaviour ==
The false garden mantis is not aggressive to humans. Females cannot fly due to their very reduced wings but the flying male is long winged and is not as big as the female. While some female false garden mantises eat their mates, this is largely dependent on the condition of the female; in a study conducted in 2012, 90% of starving female false garden mantises engaged in sexual cannibalism, whereas 0% of females in best condition did. Additionally, starving females put their limited resources into putting out pheromones to attract males as a way to lure them into a copulation attempt, despite being less fecund than female mantises in better condition.

== See also ==
- List of mantis genera and species
