= Oligonyx =

Scientific classification
- Kingdom: Animalia
- Phylum: Arthropoda
- Clade: Pancrustacea
- Class: Insecta
- Order: Mantodea
- Family: Thespidae
- Subtribe: Oligonychina
- Genus: Oligonyx; Saussure, 1869

Species
- See text

Synonyms
- Harpagonyx Saussure, 1892; Spanionyx Saussure, 1892

Genus of praying mantises

Oligonyx is a genus of mantises in the family Thespidae.

== Species ==
The following species are recognised in the genus:

- Oligonyx armentari Anderson, 2025 - Hipsanola.
- Oligonyx bicornis Saussure, 1869
- Oligonyx bidens Saussure & Zehntner, 1894
- Oligonyx chactas Anderson, 2025 - Mexico (Cozumel).
- Oligonyx maya Saussure & Zehntner, 1894
- Oligonyx nebulosus Anderson, 2025 - Honduras.
- Oligonyx undulicoxa Anderson, 2025 - Honduras.

See also:

- Oligonyx insularis Bonfils, 1967 [?]
- Oligonyx dohrnianus Saussure & Zehntner, 1894 (Nomen dubium per Anderson, 2025)
- Oligonyx gryps Saussure & Zehntner, 1894 (Nomen dubium per Anderson, 2025)

== See also ==
- List of mantis genera and species
