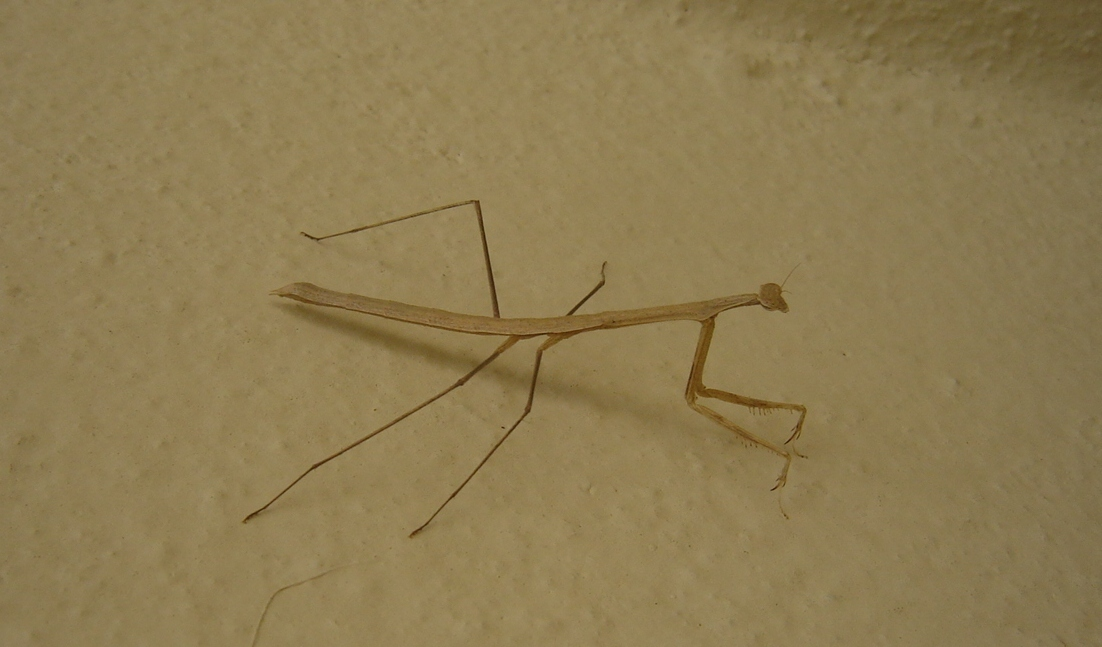
- Bistanta mexicana, Culiacán

Scientific classification
- Kingdom: Animalia
- Phylum: Arthropoda
- Clade: Pancrustacea
- Class: Insecta
- Order: Mantodea
- Family: Thespidae
- Subtribe: Oligonychina
- Genus: Bistanta

Species
- Bistanta addenda (Anderson, 2022); Bistanta campestris (Anderson, 2022); Bistanta herema (Anderson, 2022); Bistanta mexicana (Saussure & Zehntner, 1894); Bistanta tolteca (Saussure & Zehntner, 1894)

= Bistanta =

Genus of praying mantises

Bistanta is a previously monotypic genus of praying mantises in the family Thespidae that is native to Mexico and the Southwestern United States. It is represented by five species:

- Bistanta addenda (Anderson, 2022)
- Bistanta campestris (Anderson, 2022)
- Bistanta herema (Anderson, 2022)
- Bistanta mexicana (Saussure & Zehntner, 1894) (Mexican bistanta)
- Bistanta tolteca (Saussure & Zehntner, 1894)

== Distribution ==
Although mostly located in Mexico, species in Bistanta have been located in Central America, Arizona, Southern Texas, and some parts of New Mexico.

== Biology ==
=== Characteristics ===
Bistanta is best described as slender and elongated with heads that are relatively small compared to their bodies. All described species of Bistanta are colored shades of brown or tan but occasionally grayish.

== See also ==
- List of mantis genera and species
