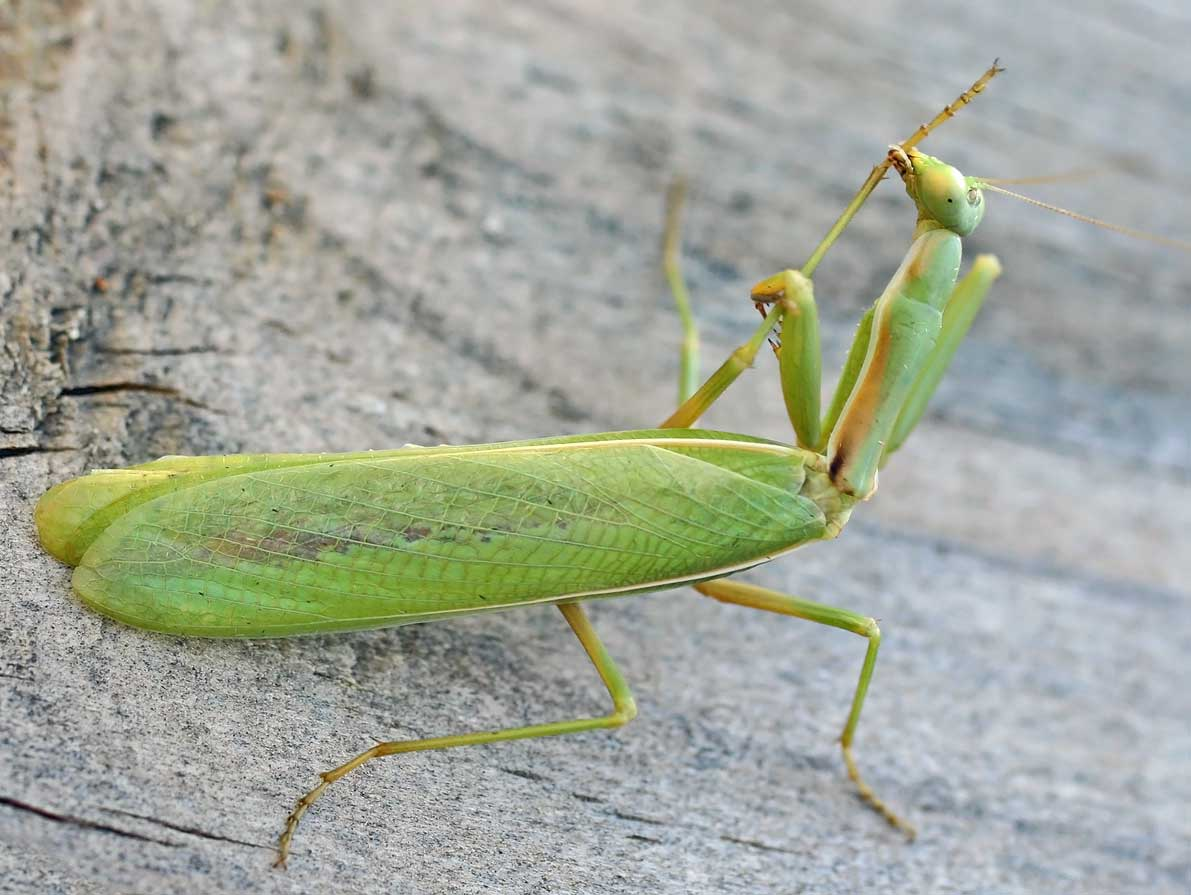
- Iris oratoria

Scientific classification
- Kingdom: Animalia
- Phylum: Arthropoda
- Clade: Pancrustacea
- Class: Insecta
- Order: Mantodea
- Family: Eremiaphilidae
- Subfamily: Iridinae
- Genus: Iris; Saussure, 1869

= Iris (mantis) =

Genus of mantises

Iris is a genus of praying mantis found in Africa, Asia, and Southern Europe with one species, Iris oratoria, being introduced to North America in the south-western United States.

== Species ==
The following species are recognised in the genus Iris:

- Iris caeca
- Iris deserti
- Iris insolita
- Iris nana
- Iris narzykulovi
- Iris oratoria (Mediterranean mantis)
- Iris orientalis
- Iris persa
- Iris persiminima
- Iris pitcheri
- Iris polystictica
- Iris senegalensis
- Iris splendida
- Iris strigosa

== See also ==
- List of mantis genera and species
