= Astape =

Scientific classification
- Kingdom: Animalia
- Phylum: Arthropoda
- Clade: Pancrustacea
- Class: Insecta
- Order: Mantodea
- Family: Haaniidae
- Genus: Astape; Stål, 1877
- Species: A. denticollis

Binomial name
- Astape denticollis Stål, 1877

Synonyms
- Parairidopteryx Saussure, 1871

Genus of praying mantises

Astape is a genus of praying mantis in the family Haaniidae, containing the single species Astape denticollis.
