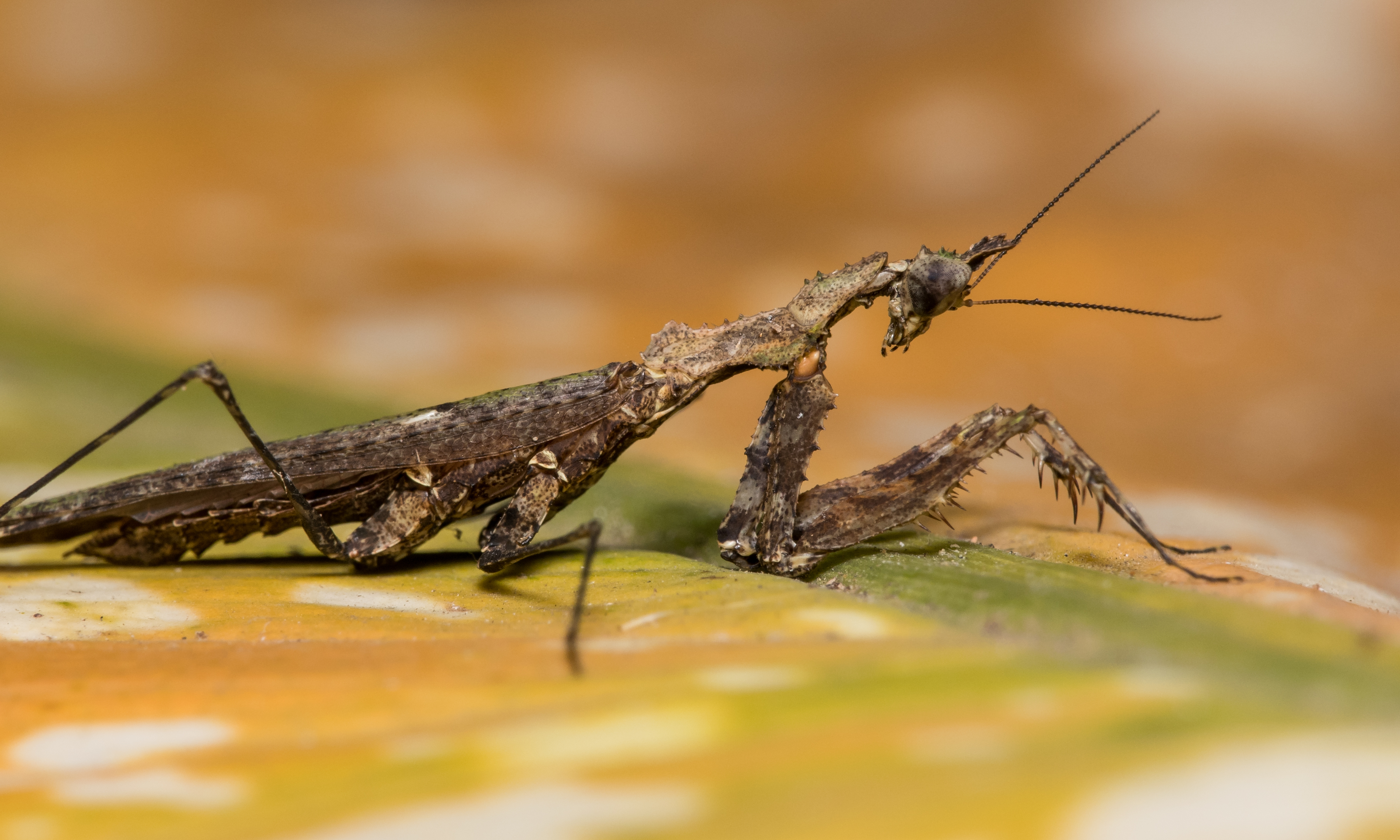
- Haania sp.

Scientific classification
- Kingdom: Animalia
- Phylum: Arthropoda
- Clade: Pancrustacea
- Class: Insecta
- Order: Mantodea
- Clade: Mantimorpha
- Superfamily: Haanioidea; Giglio-Tos, 1915
- Family: Haaniidae; Giglio-Tos, 1915

= Haaniidae =

Family of praying mantises

The Haaniidae are a family of praying mantids, based on the type genus Haania. The first use of "Haaniidae" was by Ermanno Giglio-Tos and it was revived as part of a major revision of mantid taxonomy; genera in the subfamily Haaniinae havie been moved here from the family Thespidae.

The new placement is in superfamily Haanioidea (of group Cernomantodea) and infraorder Schizomantodea. Genera in this family have been recorded from: India, Indochina and Malesia through to New Guinea.

== Subfamilies, tribes and genera ==
The Mantodea Species File lists two subfamilies:

=== Caliridinae ===
- Caliris Giglio-Tos, 1915
- Gildella Giglio-Tos, 1915

=== Haaniinae ===
tribe Arriini

- Arria Stal, 1877
- Sinomiopteryx Tinkham, 1937

tribe Haaniini

- Astape Stal, 1877
- Haania Saussure, 1871
