= Caliris =

Scientific classification
- Kingdom: Animalia
- Phylum: Arthropoda
- Clade: Pancrustacea
- Class: Insecta
- Order: Mantodea
- Family: Haaniidae
- Subfamily: Caliridinae
- Genus: Caliris; Giglio-Tos, 1915

Species
- See text

Synonyms
- Beesoniella Werner, 1935; Beesonula Uvarov, 1939

Genus of praying mantises

Caliris is a genus of mantises in the family Haaniidae. Species in this genus are found in Asia.

== Species ==
The following species are recognised in the genus Caliris: lists:

- Caliris elegans Giglio-Tos, 1915
- Caliris masoni Westwood, 1889 - type species
- Caliris melli Beier, 1933
- Caliris pallens Wang, 1993
- Caliris pallida (Werner, 1935)
- Caliris mukherjeei (Kamila & Sureshanner, 2022)
