= Bantiella =

Scientific classification
- Kingdom: Animalia
- Phylum: Arthropoda
- Clade: Pancrustacea
- Class: Insecta
- Order: Mantodea
- Family: Thespidae
- Subfamily: Bantiinae
- Genus: Bantiella; Giglio-Tos, 1915

Genus of praying mantises

Bantiella is a genus of mantis in the family Thespidae.

== See also ==
- List of mantis genera and species
