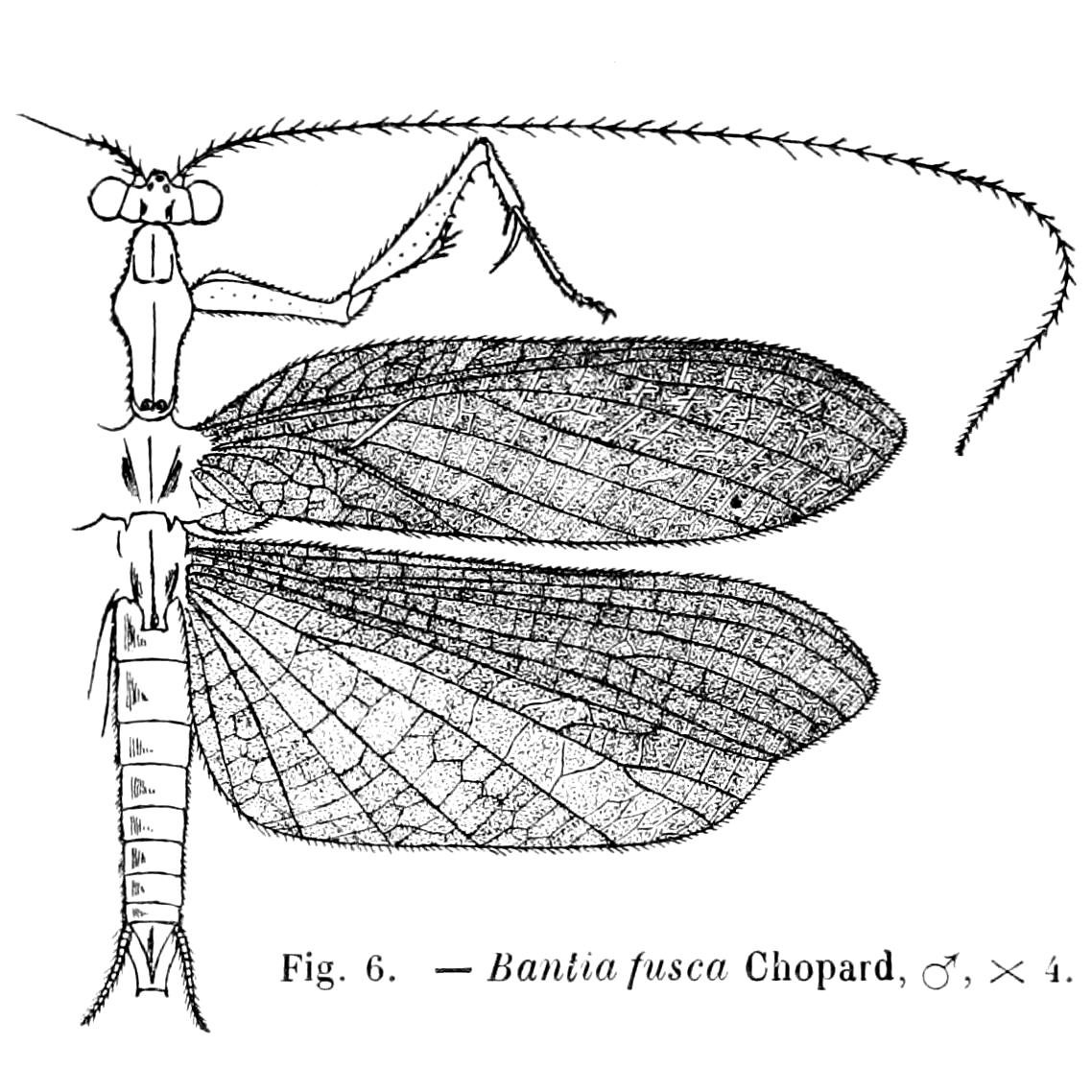
- Bantia fusca

Scientific classification
- Kingdom: Animalia
- Phylum: Arthropoda
- Clade: Pancrustacea
- Class: Insecta
- Order: Mantodea
- Superfamily: Thespoidea; Saussure, 1869
- Family: Thespidae; Saussure, 1869

Subfamilies
- Bantiinae; Miobantiinae; Musoniellinae; Pseudomiopteriginae; Pseudopogonogastrinae; Thespinae

= Thespidae =

Family of praying mantises

Thespidae is a family of insects in the order Mantodea. Following a major revision of this order in 2019, the old-world subfamilies Haaniinae and Hoplocoryphinae, previously placed here, have been upgraded to family level. Thespidae are mostly Neotropical and few species have reached the Nearctic realm.

== Subfamilies and genera ==
The following taxa are recognised in the family Thespidae:

Bantiinae
- Bantia Stal, 1877
- Bantiella Giglio-Tos, 1915
- Diabantia Giglio-Tos, 1915
- Mantellias Westwood, 1889
- Mantillica Westwood, 1889
- Thrinaconyx Saussure, 1892

Miobantiinae

- Anamiopteryx Giglio-Tos, 1915
- Chloromiopteryx Giglio-Tos, 1915 (synonym Emboicy Terra, 1995)
- Eumiopteryx Giglio-Tos, 1915
- Miobantia Giglio-Tos, 1915
- Paradiabantia Toledo Piza, 1973

Musoniellinae

- Leptomiopteryx Chopard, 1911
- Eumusonia Giglio-Tos, 1916
- Musoniella Giglio-Tos, 1916
- Pizaia Terra, 1982

Pseudomiopteriginae

- Promiopteryx Giglio-Tos, 1915
- Pseudomiopteryx Saussure, 1870

Pseudopogonogastrinae

- Pseudopogonogaster Beier, 1942

Thespinae

- Bistanta Anderson, 2018
- Galapagia Scudder, 1893
- Liguanea Rehn & Hebard, 1938
- Oligonicella Giglio-Tos, 1915
- Oligonyx Saussure, 1869
- Piscomantis Rivera & Vergara-Cobián
- Thesprotia Stal, 1877
- Carrikerella Hebard, 1921
- Pogonogaster Rehn, 1918
- Thesprotiella Giglio-Tos, 1915
- Macromusonia Hebard, 1922
- Musonia Stal, 1877
- Musoniola Giglio-Tos, 1917
- Paramusonia Rehn, 1904
- Pseudomusonia Werner, 1909
- Thespis Serville, 1831

== See also ==
- List of mantis genera and species
