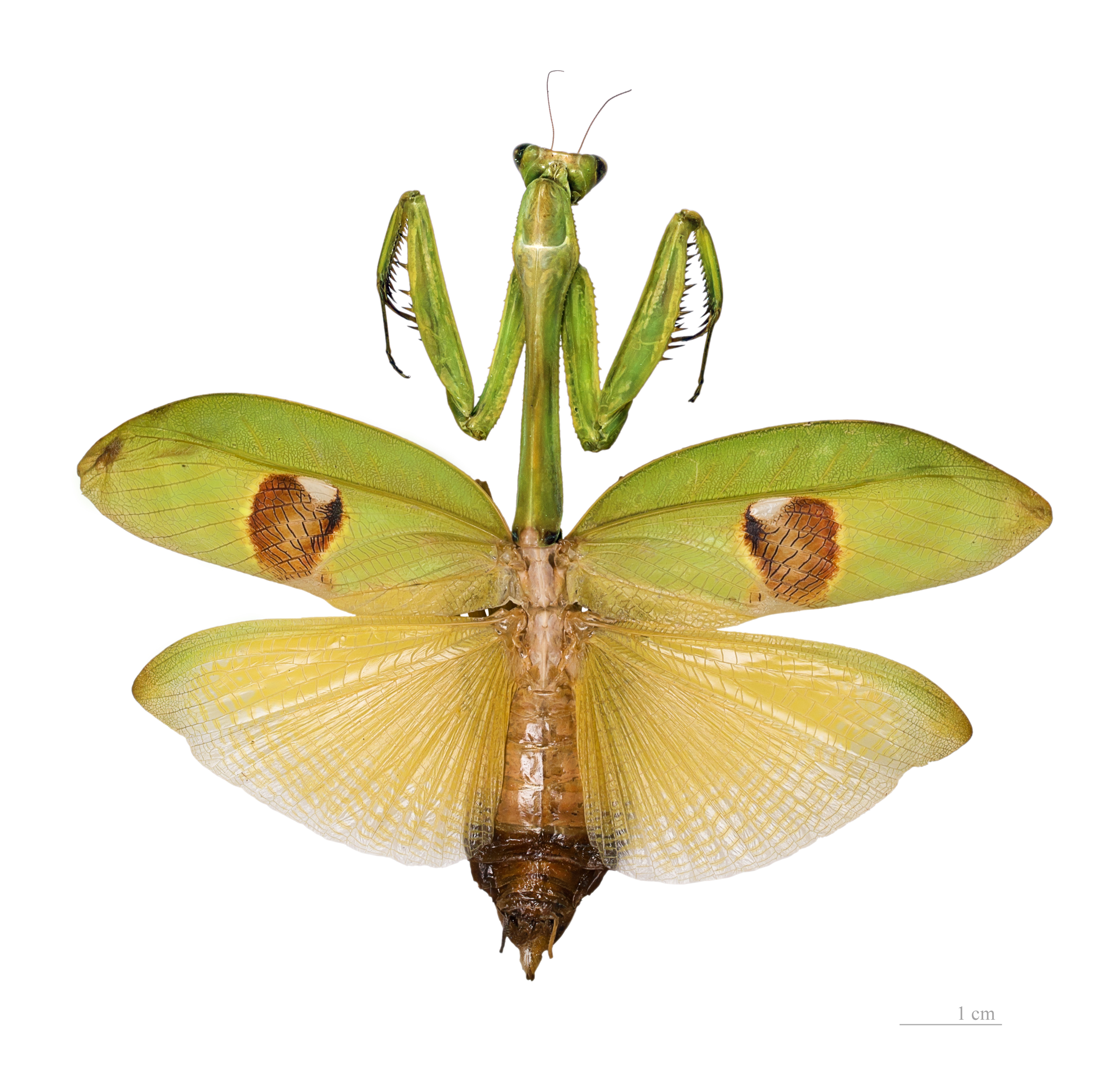
- Adult female Stagmatoptera supplicaria

Scientific classification
- Kingdom: Animalia
- Phylum: Arthropoda
- Clade: Pancrustacea
- Class: Insecta
- Order: Mantodea
- Family: Mantidae
- Subfamily: Stagmatopterinae

Genera
- 7 genera, see text

= Stagmatopterinae =

Subfamily of praying mantises

Stagmatopterinae was a subfamily of the Mantidae, a family of insects within the order of mantises (Mantodea). Many of the genera have now been placed in the subfamily Vatinae.

== Genera ==
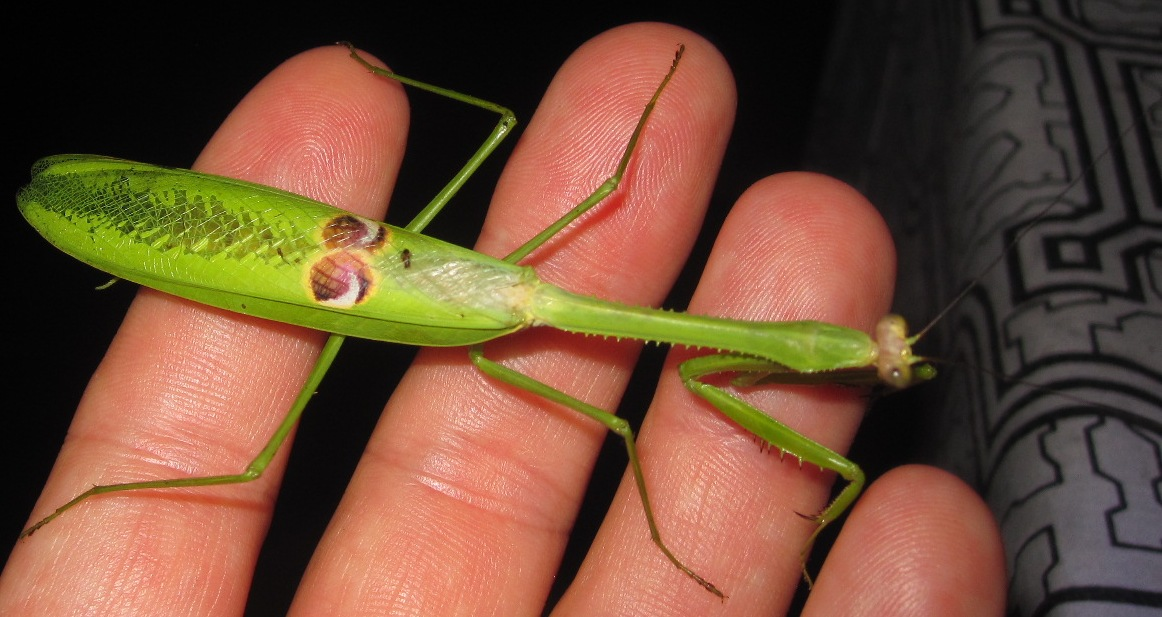
adult male Stagmatoptera supplicaria in the Amazon rainforest near Nauta, Peru

The Stagmatopterinae subfamily consisted of 6 genera, and 50 species.

- Catoxyopsis
  - Catoxyopsis dubiosa
- Lobocneme
  - Lobocneme colombiae
  - Lobocneme icterica Saussure & Zehntner, 1894 (synonym Paroxyopsis icterica)
  - Lobocneme lobipes
- Oxyopsis
  - Oxyopsis acutipennis
  - Oxyopsis festae
  - Oxyopsis gracilis (South American green mantis)
  - Oxyopsis lobeter
  - Oxyopsis media
  - Oxyopsis obtusa
  - Oxyopsis oculea
  - Oxyopsis peruviana (Peruvian mantis)
  - Oxyopsis rubicunda
  - Oxyopsis saussurei
  - Oxyopsis stali
- Parastagmatoptera
  - Parastagmatoptera amazonica
  - Parastagmatoptera concolor
  - Parastagmatoptera confusa
  - Parastagmatoptera flavoguttata (synonym = Parastagmatoptera abnormis)
  - Parastagmatoptera glauca
  - Parastagmatoptera hoorie
  - Parastagmatoptera immaculata
  - Parastagmatoptera pellucida
  - Parastagmatoptera serricornis
  - Parastagmatoptera simulacrum
  - Parastagmatoptera tessellata
  - Parastagmatoptera unipunctata
  - Parastagmatoptera vitreola
  - Parastagmatoptera vitrepennis
  - Parastagmatoptera zernyi
- Pseudoxyops
  - Pseudoxyops boliviana
  - Pseudoxyops borellii
  - Pseudoxyops diluta
  - Pseudoxyops minuta
  - Pseudoxyops perpulchra
- Stagmatoptera
  - Stagmatoptera abdominalis
  - Stagmatoptera binotata
  - Stagmatoptera biocellata
  - Stagmatoptera femoralis
  - Stagmatoptera flavipennis
  - Stagmatoptera hyaloptera (Argentine white crested mantis)
  - Stagmatoptera luna
  - Stagmatoptera nova
  - Stagmatoptera pia
  - Stagmatoptera praecaria
  - Stagmatoptera reimoseri
  - Stagmatoptera septentrionalis
  - Stagmatoptera supplicaria
  - Stagmatoptera vischeri

== See also ==
- List of mantis genera and species
