= List of mantids of Trinidad and Tobago =

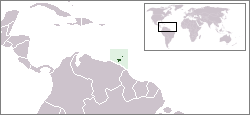
Location of Trinidad and Tobago in the Caribbean

The mantids of Trinidad and Tobago are part of the invertebrate fauna of both islands, part of the Natural history of Trinidad and Tobago.

Beginning with Lawrence Bruner in 1906 describing 8 species on the island of Trinidad, then followed by Beebe, Crane & Hughes-Schrader in 1952 and Kevan in 1953. Both papers in the 1950s increased the number of species identified.

== Mantids by family ==
Mantoididae

- Mantoida fulgidipennis Westwood, 1889

Thespidae

- Thespinae
  - Musonia surinama (Saussure, 1869)
  - Thespis media (Giglio-Tos, 1916)
  - Macromusonia sp. Hebard, 1922
- Oligonicinae
  - Thesprotia filum (Lichtenstein, 1796)
- Miopteryginae
  - Bantiella trinitatis Giglio-Tos 1915

Acanthopidae

- Acontistinae
  - Acontista multicolor (Saussure, 1870)
  - Tithrone roseipennis (Saussure, 1877)
- Acanthopinae
  - Acanthops parafalcata Lombardo & Ippolito, 2004

Mantidae

- Angelinae
  - Angela quinquemaculata (Olivier, 1792)
- Stagmomantinae
  - Stagmomantis carolina (Johannson, 1763)

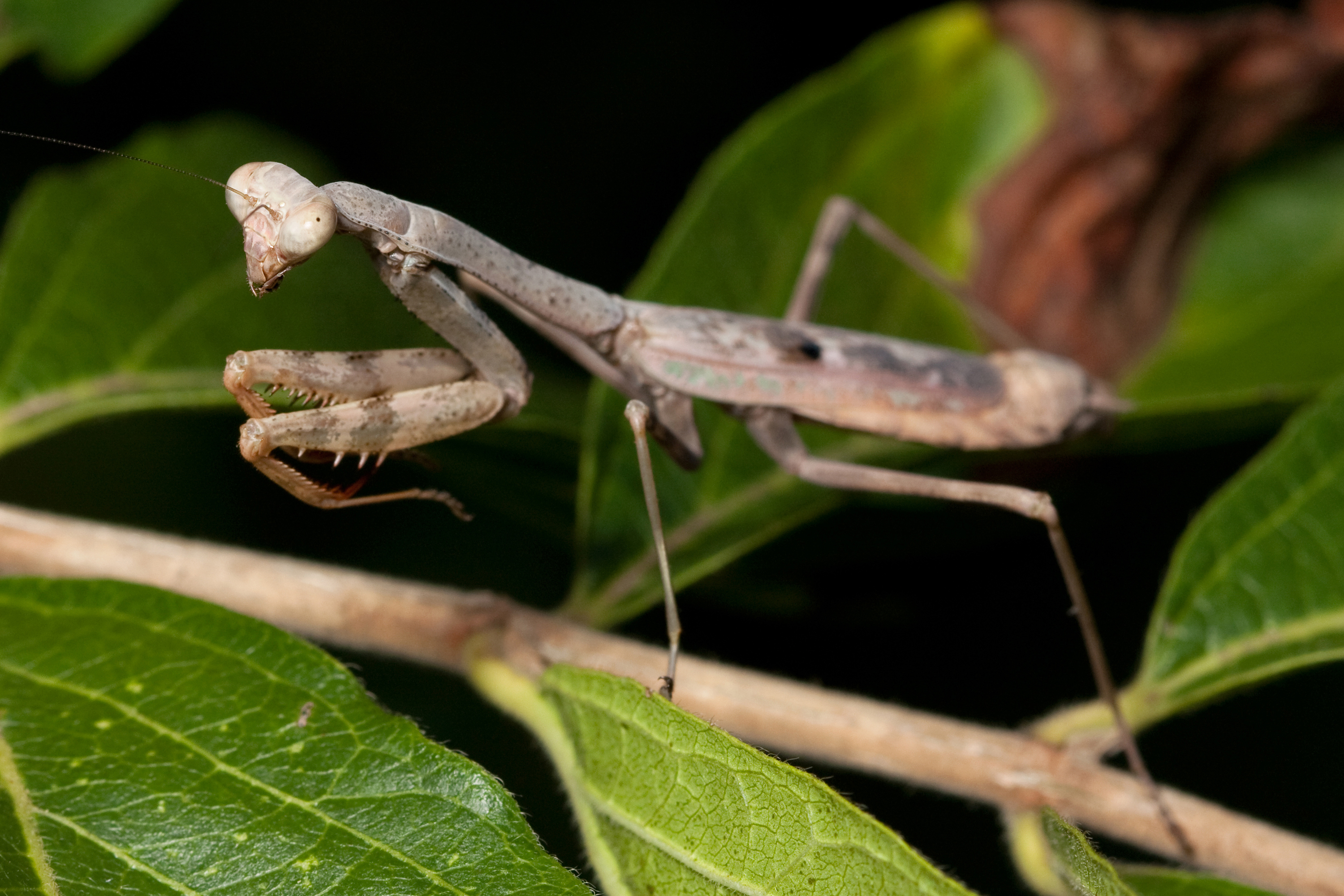
Stagmomantis carolina

- Stagmatopterinae
  - Stagmatoptera septentrionalis Saussure & Zehntner, 1894
  - Parastagmatoptera unipunctata Burmeister, 1838
  - Oxyopsis rubicunda Stoll, 1813
- Vatinae
  - Vates lobata (Fabricius, 1798)
  - Phyllovates tripunctata (Burmeister, 1838)
- Photinae
  - Paraphotina reticulata (Saussure 1871)
  - Brunneria subaptera Saussure 1869

Liturgusidae

- Liturgusinae
  - Liturgusa trinidadensis Svenson 2014
