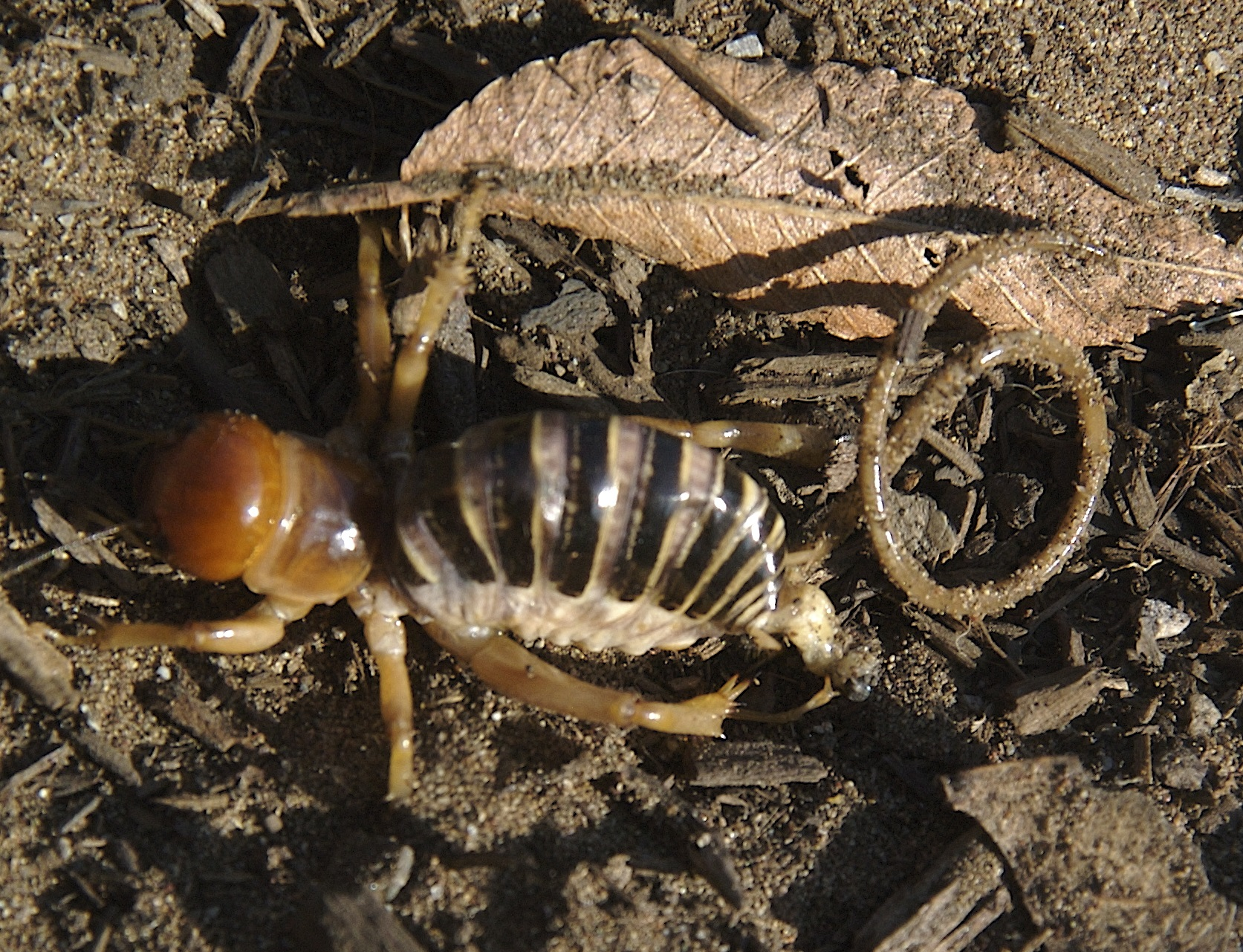
- Gordius sp. emerging from a Jerusalem cricket

Scientific classification
- Kingdom: Animalia
- Phylum: Nematomorpha
- Class: Gordioida
- Order: Gordioidea
- Family: Gordiidae
- Genus: Gordius; Linnaeus, 1758

Species
- 79, see text

= Gordius (worm) =

Genus of horsehair worms

Gordius is a genus of worms in the phylum Nematomorpha, the horsehair worms. It was formerly treated as the only genus in the family Gordiidae, but the genus Acutogordius is now considered as distinct. The genus is distributed worldwide except for Antarctica, where no Nematomorpha have been recorded.

== Description ==
The adult worm is a free-living animal. It is hairlike, very long and very thin. It commonly grows over a meter long, with the record length held by a specimen of G. fulgur over two meters long, and may be only about one millimeter wide. It is reddish brown to black. Besides a blunt anterior end and a slightly widened posterior end, it is featureless to the naked eye. Microscopic features include a diagnostic character of the family, both Gordius and genus Acutogordius, the postcloacal crescent of the male, a fold in the cuticle curving around the back side of the cloaca. At the front end of the body there is a white cap and a dark collar. At the posterior end there are tiny bristles, sometimes arranged in a row in front of the cloaca. Some species have a smooth body surface, and some may be slightly bumpy with flattened areoles. Most of these features are used in species identification, but are not very helpful, and it is difficult to tell species apart, in general. A thorough taxonomy of the genus will require a scanning electron microscope.

== Biology ==
These worms can only live near water, because parts of their life cycle take place in it. The adult overwinters in soil and debris and the female enters a water body such as a swamp or a stream to lay eggs. A gelatinous string of eggs each about 50 micrometers long is released into the water. The female can produce a great many eggs, perhaps up to 27 million in its lifetime.

Juveniles require a host in which to complete their development. Upon emergence from the egg the larva swims about until it is consumed by a host insect. Most Gordius worms are parasites of beetles. Other recorded hosts include mantids such as the European mantis (Mantis religiosa) and Hierodula membranacea, Idolomantis diabolica, Sphodromantis viridis, and Stagmatoptera praecaria. Species have been observed in caddisfly and mosquito larvae. Once ingested by the insect the worm larva penetrates the gut wall and develops in a cyst in the tissue outside. It emerges as an adult worm in a few months.

Gordius worms have been recovered from human vomit, feces, and urine. When worms are expelled from the gastrointestinal tract, their mode of entry was likely ingestion of contaminated food or water, or of an infested insect. When present in the urine, the worm may have entered the urethra from the anus or while the victim was swimming in contaminated water. Horsehair worms are not considered pathogenic or parasitic on humans and their presence in the body is incidental.

Adult worms, as in some other Nematomorpha genera, may squirm in a tangled ball resembling a Gordian Knot; horsehair worms are also referred to as gordian worms.

== Diversity ==
As of 2010 there are 79 species in the genus.

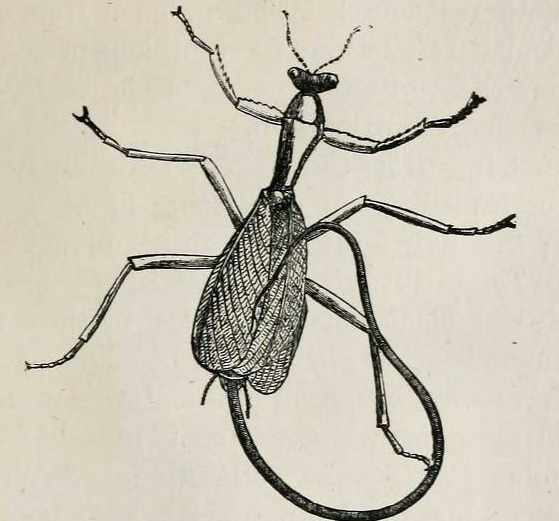
Gordius fulgur emerging from a mantid

Species include:

- Gordius aeneus
- Gordius alascensis
- Gordius albopunctatus
- Gordius alpinus
- Gordius angulatus
- Gordius aquaticus
- Gordius attoni
- Gordius balticus
- Gordius balcanicus
- Gordius bivittatus
- Gordius borisphaenicus
- Gordius cavernarum
- Gordius chilensis
- Gordius dectici
- Gordius difficilis
- Gordius digitatus
- Gordius fulgur
- Gordius germanicus
- Gordius gesneri
- Gordius guatemalensis
- Gordius helveticus
- Gordius interjectus
- Gordius japonicus
- Gordius karwendeli
- Gordius kimmeriensis
- Gordius longissimus
- Gordius lumpei
- Gordius luteopunctatus
- Gordius mongolicus
- Gordius mulleri
- Gordius nonmaculatus
- Gordius ogatai
- Gordius omensis
- Gordius paranensis
- Gordius perronciti
- Gordius pesici
- Gordius pioltii
- Gordius platyurus
- Gordius plicatulus
- Gordius preslii
- Gordius robustus
- Gordius serratus
- Gordius setiger
- Gordius sinareolatus
- Gordius solaris
- Gordius sphaerura
- Gordius spiridonovi
- Gordius stellatus
- Gordius tatrensis
- Gordius tenuis
- Gordius terminosetosus
- Gordius testaceus
- Gordius tirolensis
- Gordius turcomanicus
- Gordius undulatus
- Gordius verrucosus
- Gordius zwicki
