= Gordius balticus =

Scientific classification
- Domain: Eukaryota
- Kingdom: Animalia
- Phylum: Nematomorpha
- Class: Gordioida
- Order: Gordioidea
- Family: Gordiidae
- Genus: Gordius
- Species: G. balticus

Binomial name
- Gordius balticus Schmidt-Rhaesa, 2010

Species of horsehair worm

Gordius balticus is a species of horsehair worm belonging to the genus Gordius.

It is native to Estonia.
