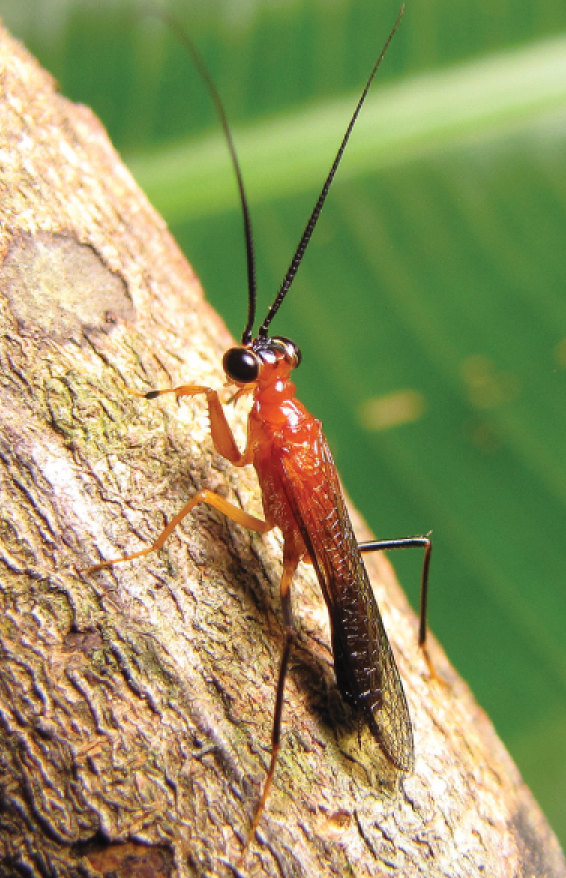

Scientific classification
- Kingdom: Animalia
- Phylum: Arthropoda
- Class: Insecta
- Order: Mantodea
- Family: Mantoididae
- Genus: Vespamantoida
- Species: V. wherleyi

Binomial name
- Vespamantoida wherleyi Svenson & Rodrigues, 2019

= Vespamantoida wherleyi =

Species of praying mantis

Vespamantoida wherleyi is a species of praying mantis that mimics a wasp. It was discovered in 2013 at a research station near the Amazon River in northern Peru. The discovery resulted in erecting a new genus, Vespamantoida. This mantis has a red/orange colored body and black pattern. Besides the coloration, it has the body shape of and displayed walking and antenna movements similar to a wasp. This mantis is closely related to Mantoida toulgoeti as both species have a distinct foreleg synapomorphy.
