= Mantoida brunneriana =

Scientific classification
- Kingdom: Animalia
- Phylum: Arthropoda
- Clade: Pancrustacea
- Class: Insecta
- Order: Mantodea
- Family: Mantoididae
- Genus: Mantoida
- Species: M. brunneriana

Binomial name
- Mantoida brunneriana (Saussure, 1871)

Synonyms
- Chaeteessa brunneriana Saussure, 1871

Species of praying mantis

Mantoida brunneriana is a species of praying mantis in the family Mantoididae. It is found in Bolivia, Brazil, French Guiana, Paraguay, and Venezuela.
