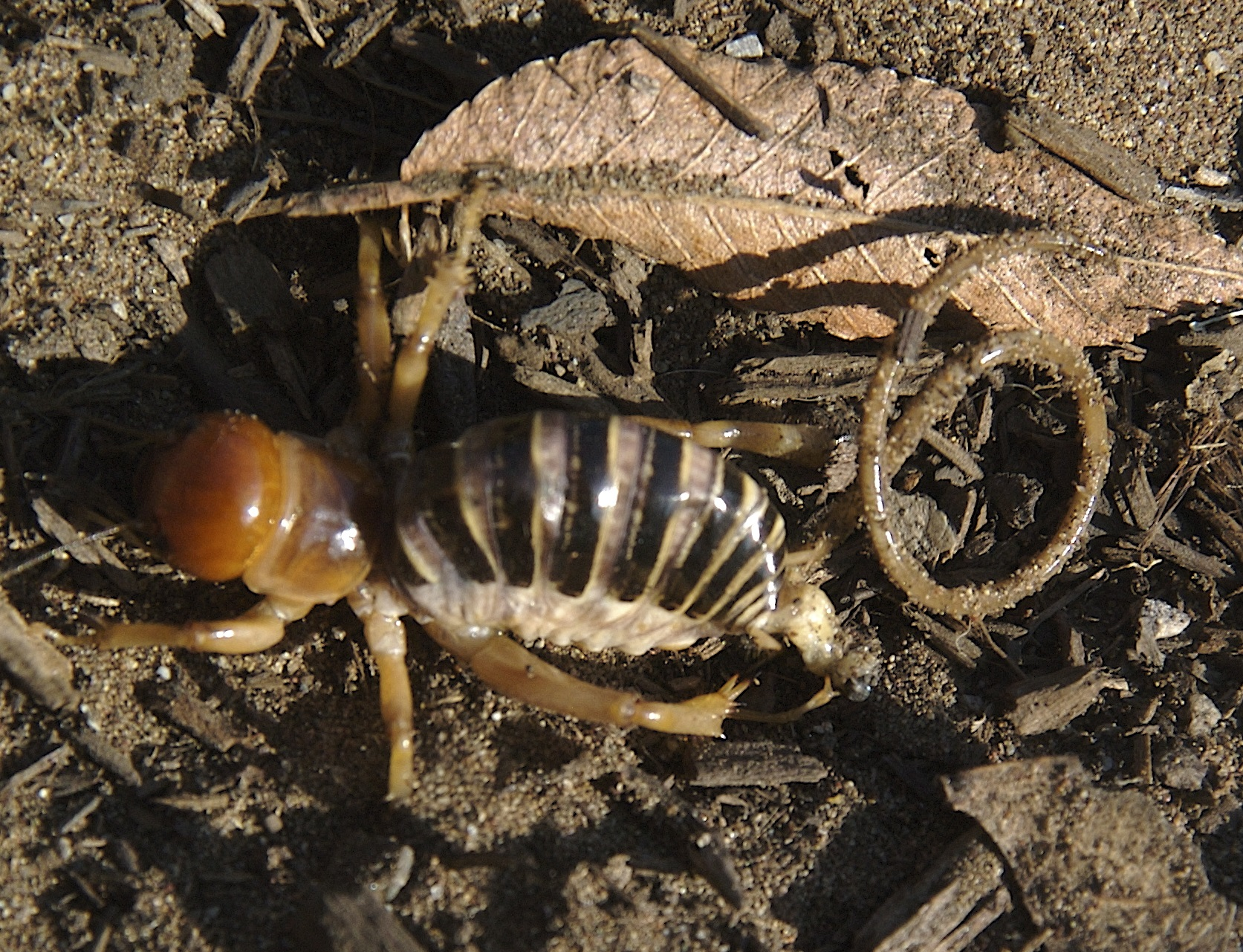
- Gordius sp. emerging from a Jerusalem cricket

Scientific classification
- Kingdom: Animalia
- Phylum: Nematomorpha
- Class: Gordioida
- Order: Gordioidea
- Family: Gordiidae
- Genus: Gordius
- Species: G. aquaticus

Binomial name
- Gordius aquaticus Linnaeus, 1758

= Gordius aquaticus =

Species of horsehair worm

Gordius aquaticus is a species of Gordius.

The species was described in 1758 by Carolus Linnaeus.

It has cosmopolitan distribution.
