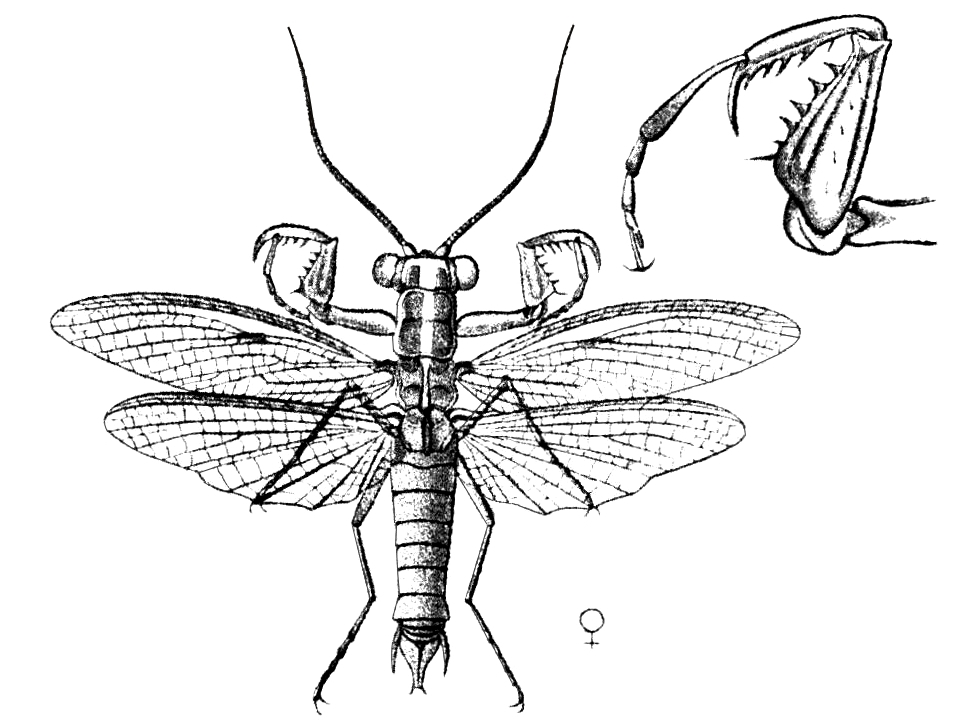

Scientific classification
- Kingdom: Animalia
- Phylum: Arthropoda
- Clade: Pancrustacea
- Class: Insecta
- Order: Mantodea
- Family: Mantoididae
- Genus: Mantoida
- Species: M. maya

Binomial name
- Mantoida maya Saussure and Zehntner, 1894

= Mantoida maya =

Species of praying mantis

Mantoida maya, common name little Yucatán mantis, is a species of praying mantis found in Mexico and the U.S. state of Florida.
