= M. nitida =

M. nitida may refer to:

- Mantoida nitida, a praying mantis species
- Melanochyla nitida, a plant species
- Millettia nitida, a legume species

== See also ==
- Nitida (disambiguation)
