= Paramantoida =

Scientific classification
- Kingdom: Animalia
- Phylum: Arthropoda
- Clade: Pancrustacea
- Class: Insecta
- Order: Mantodea
- Family: Mantoididae
- Genus: Paramantoida; Agudelo, 2014
- Species: P. amazonica

Binomial name
- Paramantoida amazonica Agudelo, 2014

Species of praying mantis

Paramantoida amazonica is a species of praying mantis from South America. It is the only species in the genus Paramantoida.

== See also ==
- List of mantis genera and species
