= Parastagmatoptera pellucida =

Scientific classification
- Kingdom: Animalia
- Phylum: Arthropoda
- Class: Insecta
- Order: Mantodea
- Family: Mantidae
- Subfamily: Vatinae
- Tribe: Stagmatopterini
- Genus: Parastagmatoptera
- Species: P. pellucida

Binomial name
- Parastagmatoptera pellucida Giglio-Tos, 1914

Species of praying mantis

Parastagmatoptera pellucida is a species of praying mantis in the family Mantidae.
