= Mantoida fulgidipennis =

Scientific classification
- Kingdom: Animalia
- Phylum: Arthropoda
- Clade: Pancrustacea
- Class: Insecta
- Order: Mantodea
- Family: Mantoididae
- Genus: Mantoida
- Species: M. fulgidipennis

Binomial name
- Mantoida fulgidipennis (Westwood, 1889)

Species of praying mantis

Mantoida fulgidipennis is a species of praying mantis in the family Mantoididae.
