= Parastagmatoptera immaculata =

Scientific classification
- Domain: Eukaryota
- Kingdom: Animalia
- Phylum: Arthropoda
- Class: Insecta
- Order: Mantodea
- Family: Mantidae
- Subfamily: Vatinae
- Tribe: Stagmatopterini
- Genus: Parastagmatoptera
- Species: P. immaculata

Binomial name
- Parastagmatoptera immaculata Chopard, 1911

Species of praying mantis

Parastagmatoptera immaculata is a species of praying mantis in the family Mantidae.
