= Parastagmatoptera simulacrum =

Scientific classification
- Kingdom: Animalia
- Phylum: Arthropoda
- Clade: Pancrustacea
- Class: Insecta
- Order: Mantodea
- Family: Mantidae
- Subfamily: Vatinae
- Tribe: Stagmatopterini
- Genus: Parastagmatoptera
- Species: P. simulacrum

Binomial name
- Parastagmatoptera simulacrum (Fabricius, 1793)

Species of praying mantis

Parastagmatoptera simulacrum is a species of praying mantis in the family Mantidae. It is found in North America.
