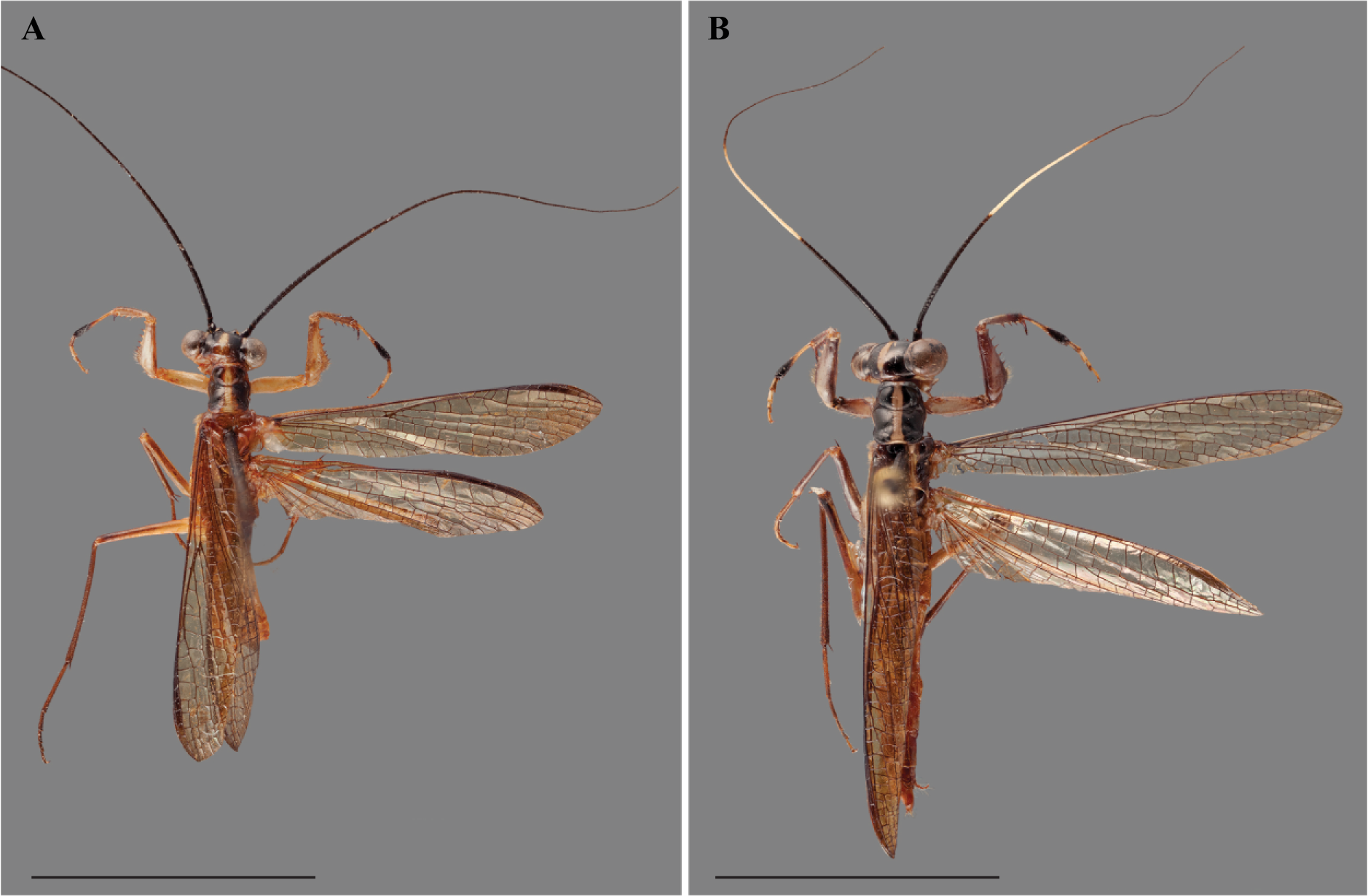
- Vespamantoida toulgoeti

Scientific classification
- Kingdom: Animalia
- Phylum: Arthropoda
- Clade: Pancrustacea
- Class: Insecta
- Order: Mantodea
- Family: Mantoididae
- Genus: Vespamantoida; Svenson & Rodrigues, 2019

Species
- See text

= Vespamantoida =

Genus of mantises

Vespamantoida is a genus of praying mantises in the family Mantoididae. The genus was erected in 2019 and the name was derived from the Latin word vespa which means wasp and Mantoida referring to the mantis. These mantis resemble and mimic the behavior of a wasp.

The genus is found in the Amazon region.

== Species ==
There are two species of mantises in this genus:

- Vespamantoida toulgoeti
- Vespamantoida wherleyi
