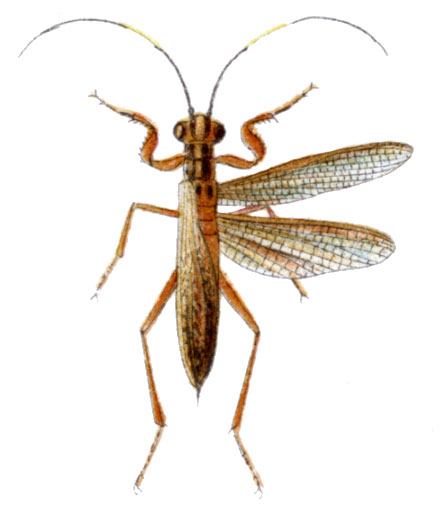
- Mantoida nitida

Scientific classification
- Kingdom: Animalia
- Phylum: Arthropoda
- Clade: Pancrustacea
- Class: Insecta
- Order: Mantodea
- Family: Mantoididae
- Genus: Mantoida; Newman, 1838

Species
- See text

Synonyms
- Annia Stal, 1877

= Mantoida =

Genus of praying mantises

Mantoida is a genus of praying mantises in the family Mantoididae. The species of this genus are native to Mexico, Central America, and South America.

== Species ==
The following species are recognised in the genus Mantoida :

- Mantoida argentinae
- Mantoida beieri
- Mantoida brunneriana
- Mantoida burmeisteri
- Mantoida fulgidipennis
- †Mantoida matthiasglinki
- Mantoida maya
- Mantoida nitida
- Mantoida ronderosi
- Mantoida schraderi
- Mantoida tenuis

== See also ==
- List of mantis genera and species
- Mantises of North America
- Mantises of South America
