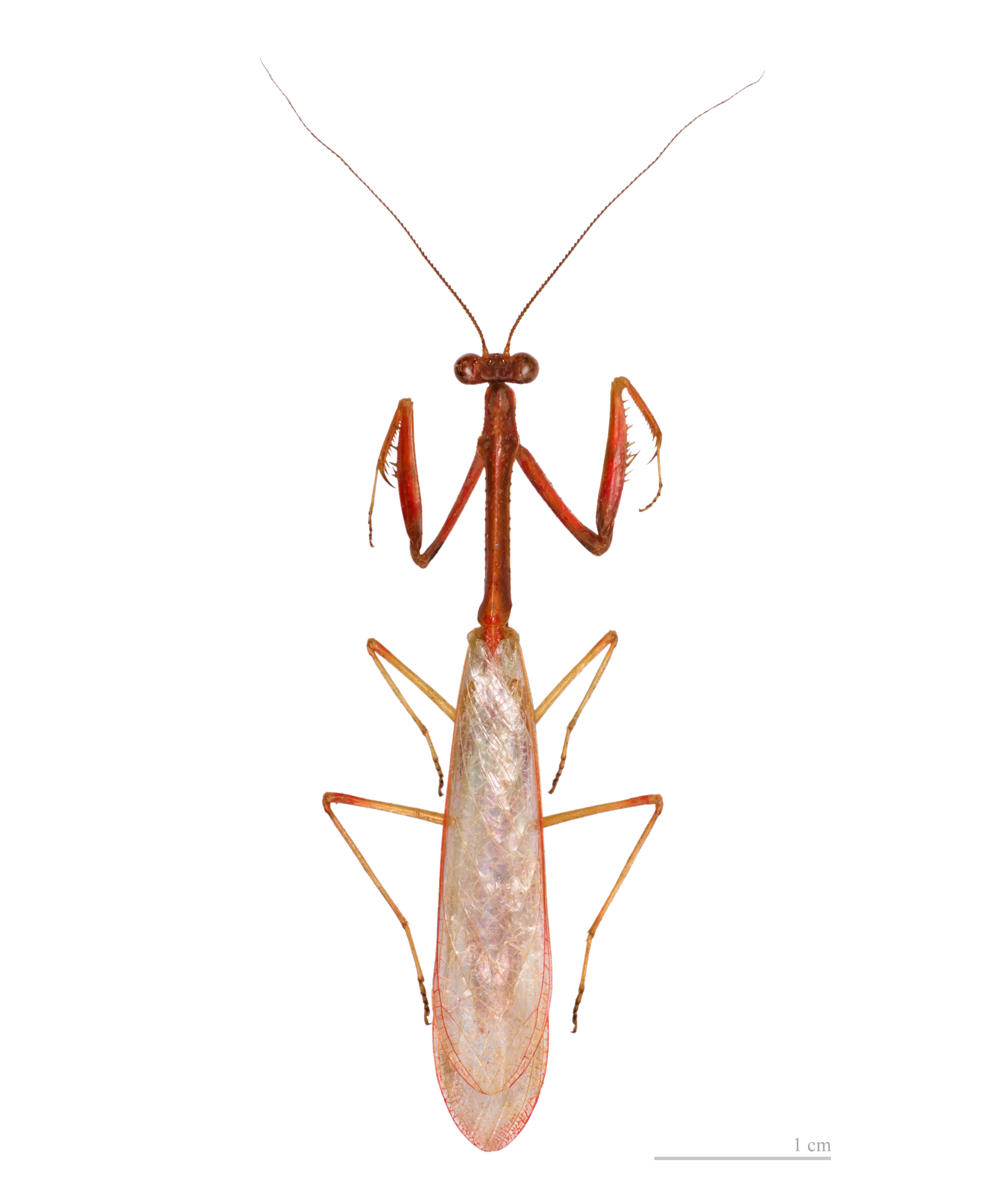
- Parastagmatoptera flavoguttata

Scientific classification
- Kingdom: Animalia
- Phylum: Arthropoda
- Clade: Pancrustacea
- Class: Insecta
- Order: Mantodea
- Family: Mantidae
- Tribe: Stagmatopterini
- Genus: Parastagmatoptera; Saussure, 1871

Species
- See text

Synonyms
- Ardesca Stal, 1877

= Parastagmatoptera =

Genus of praying mantises

Parastagmatoptera is a genus consisting of ten species of mantises in the subfamily Vatinae.

== Species ==
- Parastagmatoptera bororoi Lombardo, Umbriaco & Ippolito, 2014
- Parastagmatoptera flavoguttata Serville, 1839
- Parastagmatoptera immaculata Chopard, 1911
- Parastagmatoptera pellucida Giglio-Tos, 1914
- Parastagmatoptera simulacrum (Fabricius, 1793)
- Parastagmatoptera sottilei Lombardo, Umbriaco & Ippolito, 2014
- Parastagmatoptera theresopolitana Giglio-Tos, 1914
- Parastagmatoptera unipunctata Burmeister, 1838
- Parastagmatoptera vitreola Stal, 1877
- Parastagmatoptera zernyi Beier, 1930

== See also ==
- List of mantis genera and species
