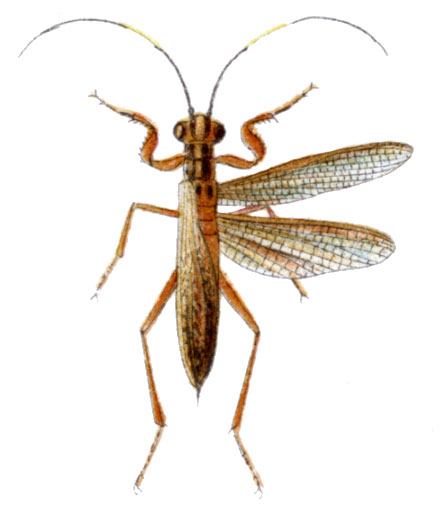

Scientific classification
- Kingdom: Animalia
- Phylum: Arthropoda
- Clade: Pancrustacea
- Class: Insecta
- Order: Mantodea
- Family: Mantoididae
- Genus: Mantoida
- Species: M. nitida

Binomial name
- Mantoida nitida Newman, 1838

= Mantoida nitida =

Species of praying mantis

Mantoida nitida is a species of praying mantis in the family Mantoididae. It is found in Mexico.

== See also ==
- List of mantis genera and species
