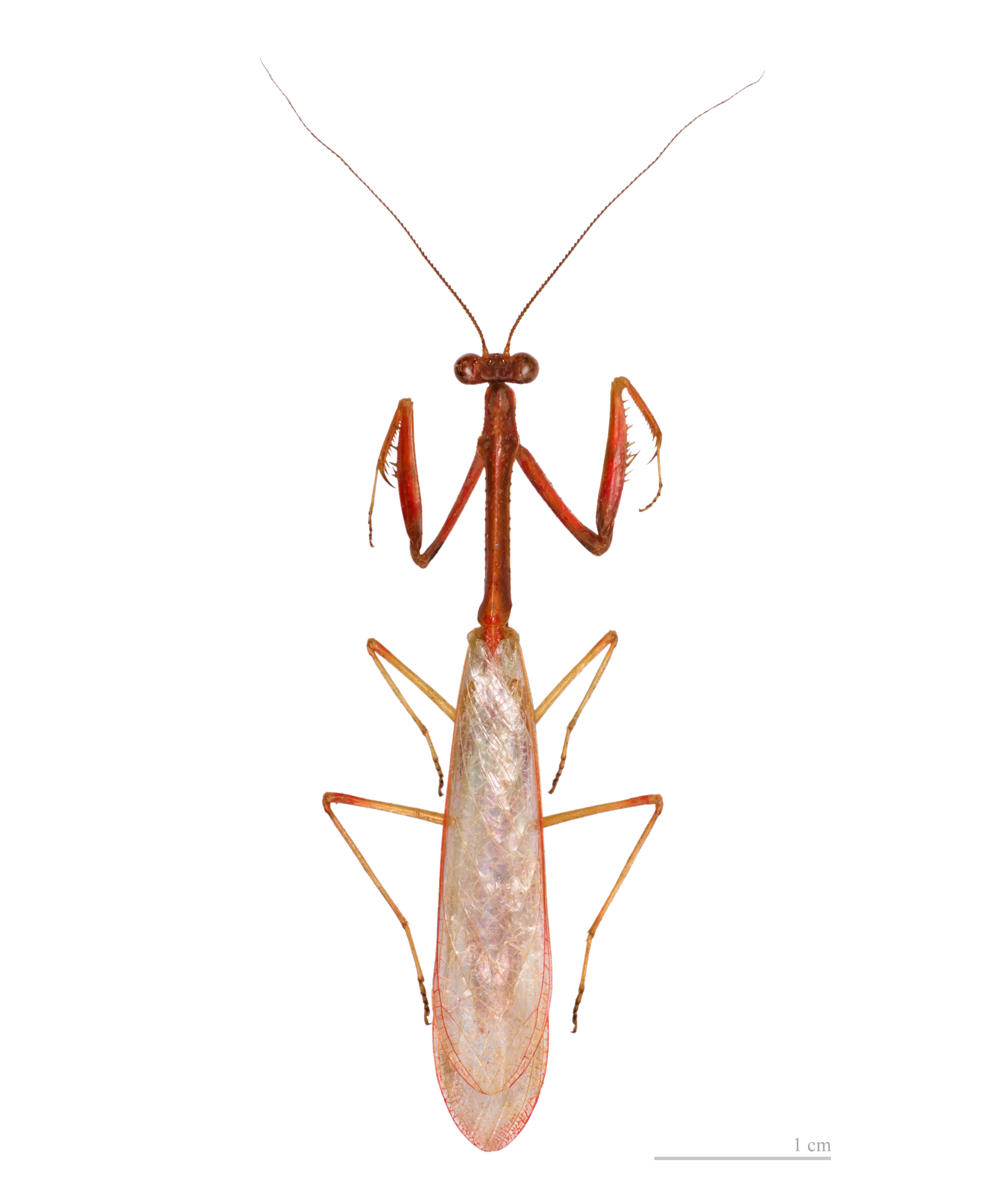

Scientific classification
- Domain: Eukaryota
- Kingdom: Animalia
- Phylum: Arthropoda
- Class: Insecta
- Order: Mantodea
- Family: Mantidae
- Subfamily: Vatinae
- Tribe: Stagmatopterini
- Genus: Parastagmatoptera
- Species: P. flavoguttata

Binomial name
- Parastagmatoptera flavoguttata Serville, 1839

Synonyms
- Parastagmatoptera abnormis Beier, 1963; Parastagmatoptera hoorie Caudell, 1910; Parastagmatoptera tessellata Saussure & Zehntner, 1894

= Parastagmatoptera flavoguttata =

Species of praying mantis

Parastagmatoptera flavoguttata is a species of praying mantis in the family Mantidae.
