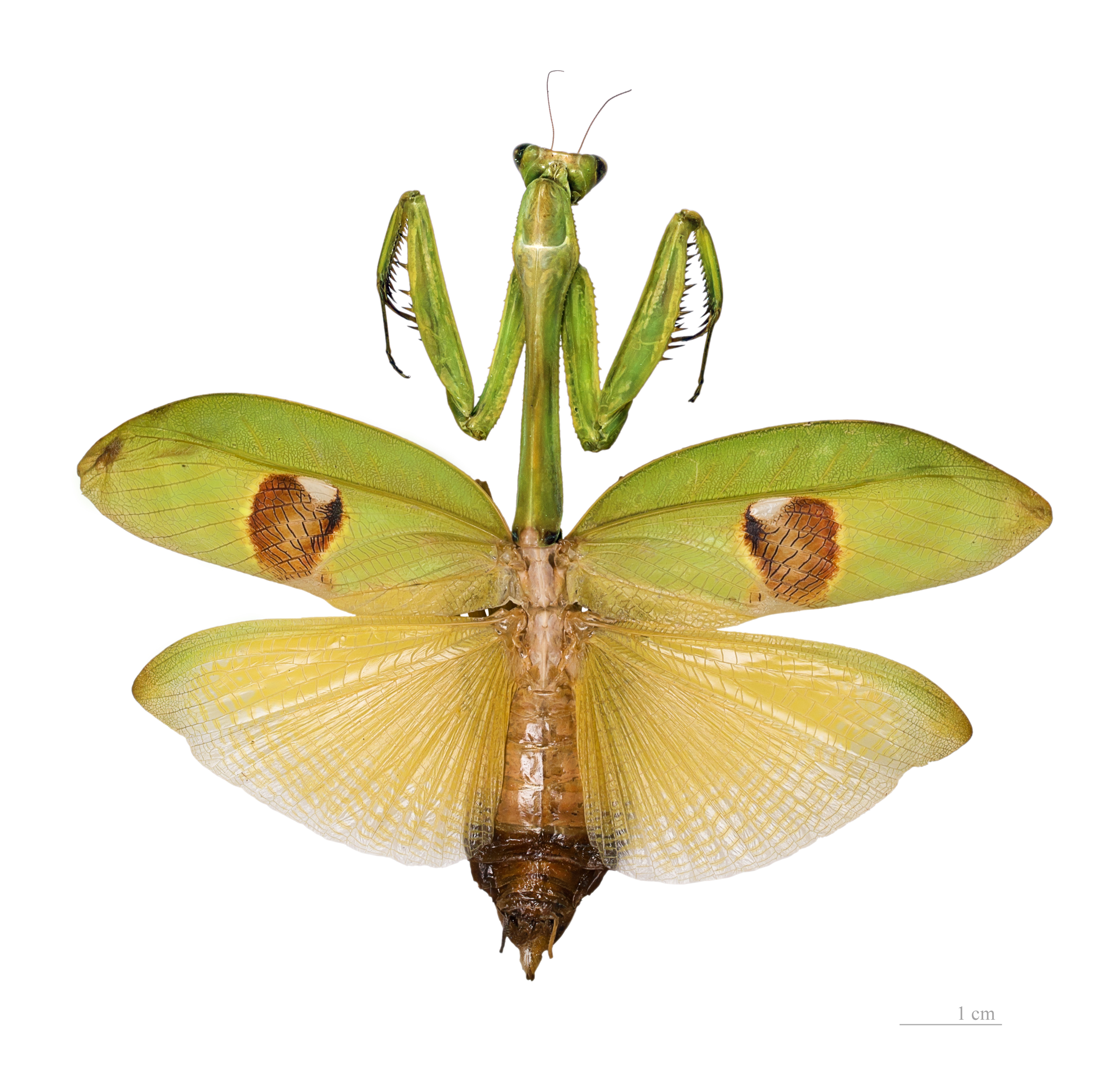
- Adult female
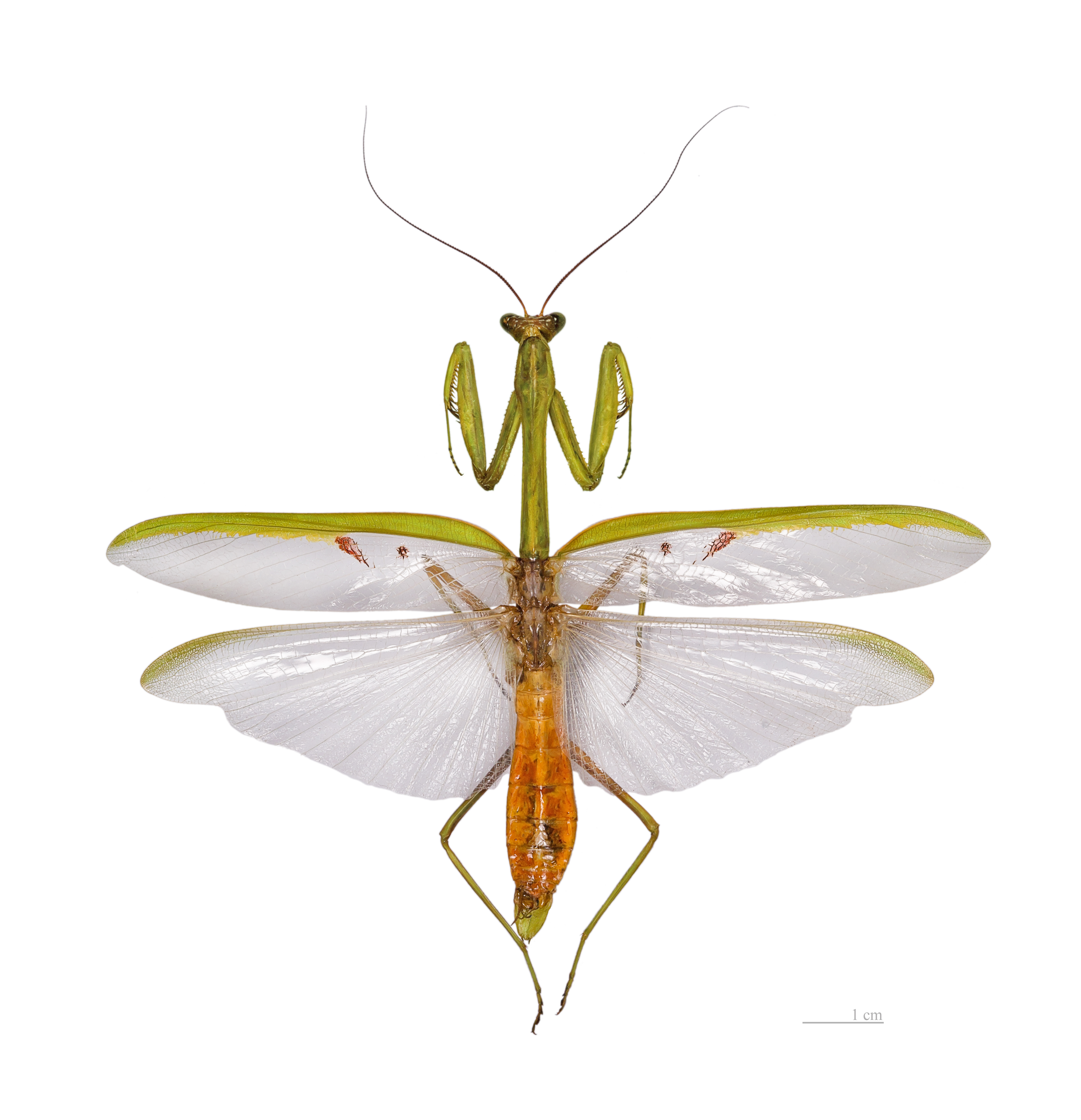
- Adult male

Scientific classification
- Kingdom: Animalia
- Phylum: Arthropoda
- Class: Insecta
- Order: Mantodea
- Family: Mantidae
- Genus: Stagmatoptera
- Species: S. supplicaria

Binomial name
- Stagmatoptera supplicaria Burmeister, 1838

Synonyms
- Stagmatoptera flavipennis Serville, 1839

= Stagmatoptera supplicaria =

Species of praying mantis

Stagmatoptera supplicaria is a species of praying mantis in the family Mantidae.

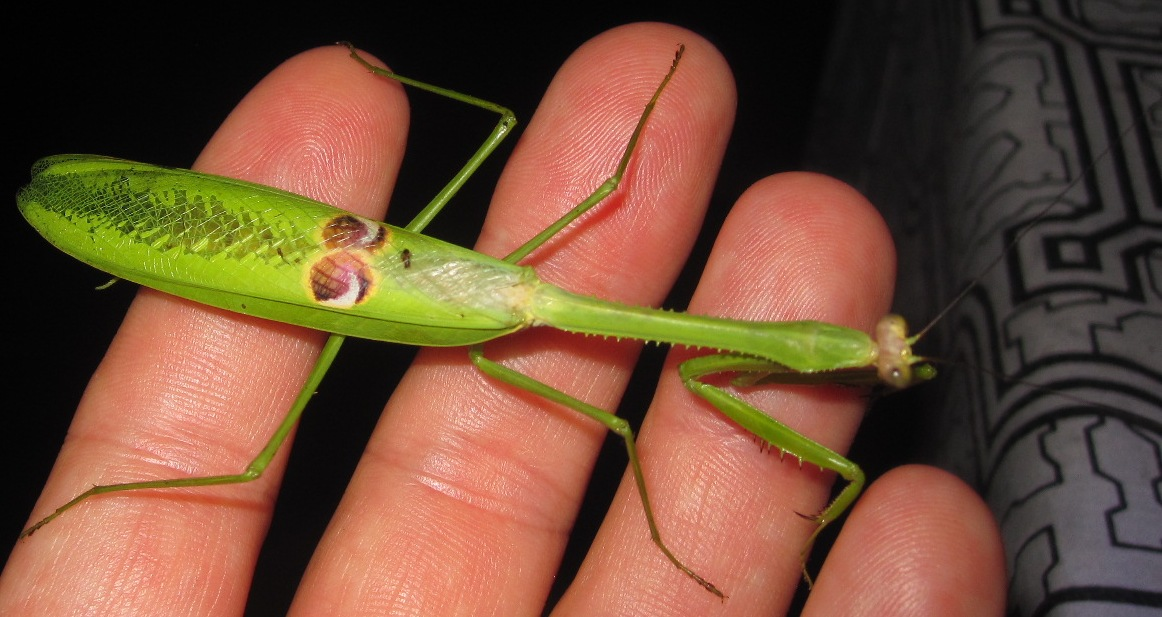
adult female Stagmatoptera supplicaria in the Amazon rainforest near Nauta, Peru

== See also ==
- List of mantis genera and species
