= Lobocneme icterica =

Scientific classification
- Kingdom: Animalia
- Phylum: Arthropoda
- Clade: Pancrustacea
- Class: Insecta
- Order: Mantodea
- Family: Mantidae
- Subfamily: Vatinae
- Genus: Lobocneme
- Species: L. icterica

Binomial name
- Lobocneme icterica (Saussure & Zehntner, 1894)

Synonyms
- Paroxyopsis icterica Saussure & Zehntner, 1894

Species of praying mantis

Lobocneme icterica is a species of praying mantis in the family Mantidae found in South America.
