= Stagmatoptera femoralis =

Scientific classification
- Domain: Eukaryota
- Kingdom: Animalia
- Phylum: Arthropoda
- Class: Insecta
- Order: Mantodea
- Family: Mantidae
- Genus: Stagmatoptera
- Species: S. femoralis

Binomial name
- Stagmatoptera femoralis Saussure & Zehntner, 1894

Synonyms
- Stagmatoptera ignota Giglio-Tos, 1914

Species of praying mantis

Stagmatoptera femoralis is a species of praying mantis in the family Mantidae.

== See also ==
- List of mantis genera and species
