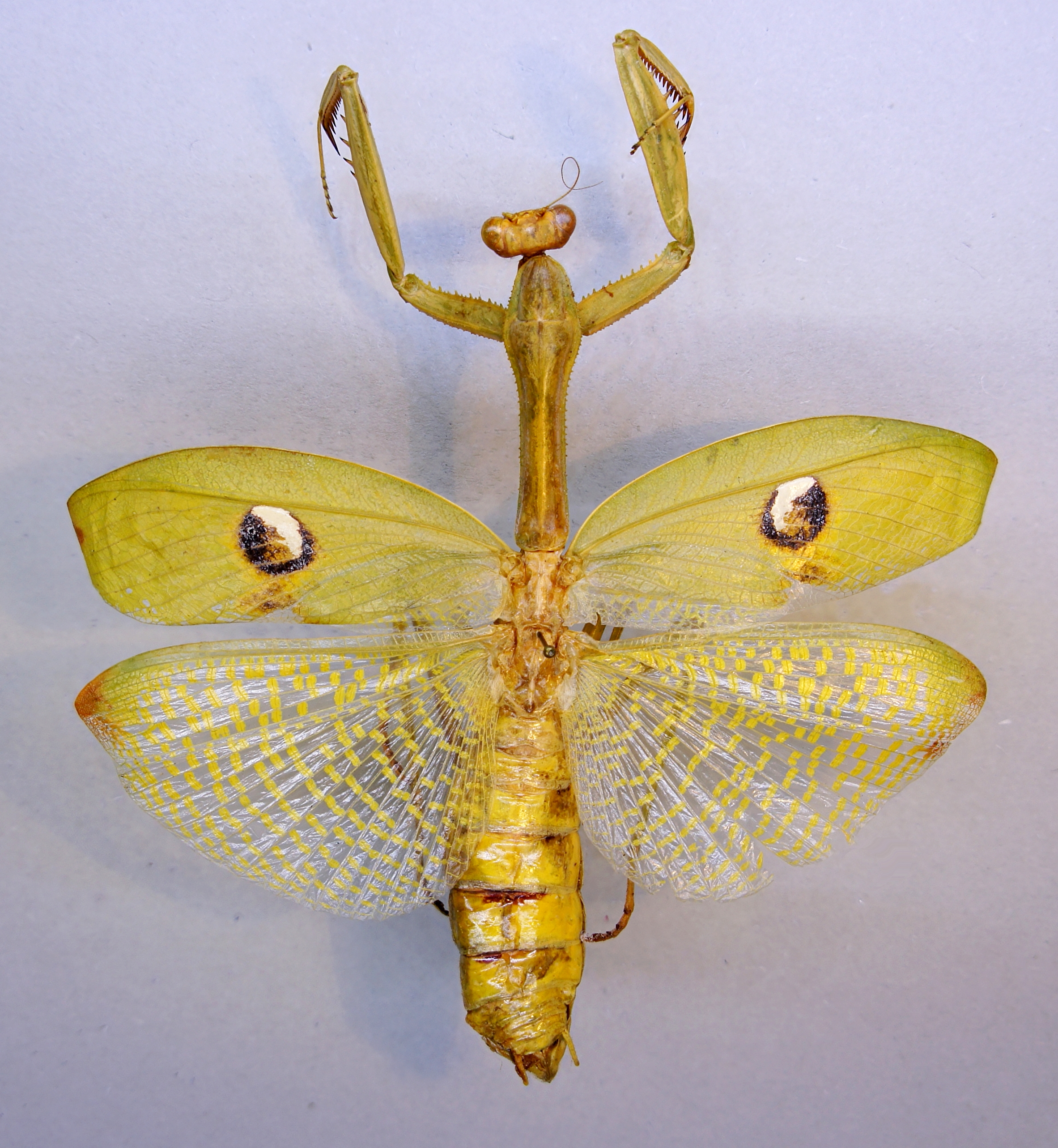
- From Zoologische Staatssammlung München

Scientific classification
- Kingdom: Animalia
- Phylum: Arthropoda
- Clade: Pancrustacea
- Class: Insecta
- Order: Mantodea
- Family: Mantidae
- Genus: Stagmatoptera
- Species: S. hyaloptera

Binomial name
- Stagmatoptera hyaloptera (Perty, 1832)

Synonyms
- Stagmatoptera bogedetica Lichtenstein, 1802; Stagmatoptera pavonina Burmeister, 1838

= Stagmatoptera hyaloptera =

Species of praying mantis

Stagmatoptera hyaloptera, common name Argentine white-crested mantis, is a species of praying mantis found in Argentina.

== See also ==
- List of mantis genera and species
