= Stagmatoptera reimoseri =

Scientific classification
- Domain: Eukaryota
- Kingdom: Animalia
- Phylum: Arthropoda
- Class: Insecta
- Order: Mantodea
- Family: Mantidae
- Genus: Stagmatoptera
- Species: S. reimoseri

Binomial name
- Stagmatoptera reimoseri Beier, 1929

Species of praying mantis

Stagmatoptera reimoseri is a species of praying mantis in the family Mantidae.

== See also ==
- List of mantis genera and species
