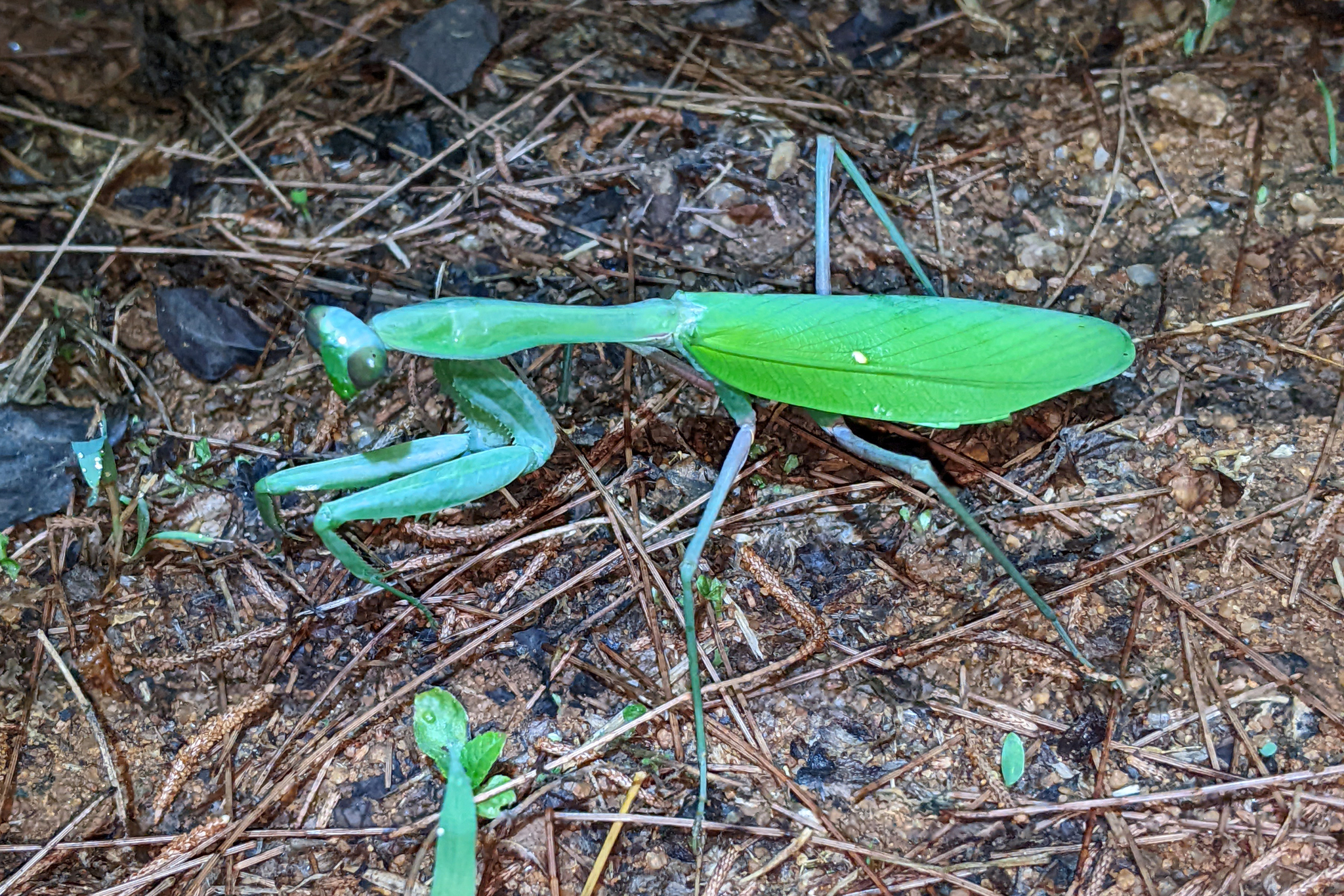
- Female from Karnataka

Scientific classification
- Kingdom: Animalia
- Phylum: Arthropoda
- Clade: Pancrustacea
- Class: Insecta
- Order: Mantodea
- Family: Mantidae
- Genus: Hierodula
- Species: H. membranacea

Binomial name
- Hierodula membranacea Burmeister, 1838

= Hierodula membranacea =

Species of praying mantis

Hierodula membranacea is a large-bodied praying mantis, sharing its common name giant Asian mantis with other large members of genus Hierodula, of which it is the type species. Its colours vary from green to yellow-green, or even brown to reddish-brown, similar to those of the giant Indian mantis and the giant Malaysian mantis. As the name suggests, it originates from south-eastern Asia and is among the largest of mantises. Male and female adults reach around 7–9 centimetres (2.8–3.5 in), excluding extended forelegs. It is a cannibalistic species, with the females sometimes eating the males after mating.

== Habitat ==
Hierodula membranacea inhabits shrubs and tree in hot and humid climates, with temperatures of 22 to 30 °C (72 to 86 °F) and a humidity of 60% to 70%.

== Biology ==
This mantis can jump around twice its body length, and although adults are capable of flight, some females occasionally have been known to jump as adults. When cornered by predators, the mantis will adopt a threat display wherein it rears back with its wings and forelegs spread and mouth opened. Should a predator ignore the display, the mantis will strike out with its forelegs and bite. While mantises are not venomous, such a defensive attack from this large species can be painful and possibly break the skin.

Like all arthropods, mantises have a hard shell called an exoskeleton. As they grow, they moult this exoskeleton to allow further growth until they reach their imago form, where they gain their wings and stop molting. During the molting process, H. membranacea often does not eat, and avoids exposure to predators as its new shell will initially be soft and vulnerable.

=== Diet ===
These huge insects can tackle large and dangerous prey such as the Asian giant hornet. As with other mantis species, H. membranacea may be cannibalistic, which is thought to increase female fecundity.

=== Reproduction ===
Reproduction occurs sexually in Hierodula membranacea, with very limited parthenogenesis abilities. A female can be identified from male by her six abdominal segments, whereas males have eight. She also has a much larger abdomen.

After mating, the female may attempt to eat the male to increase fertility, which will entail a struggle. The adult female will lay several egg cases (called oothecae) over her lifespan. From each of these oothecae, up to 150 nymphs hatch after six to eight weeks.

=== Gallery ===
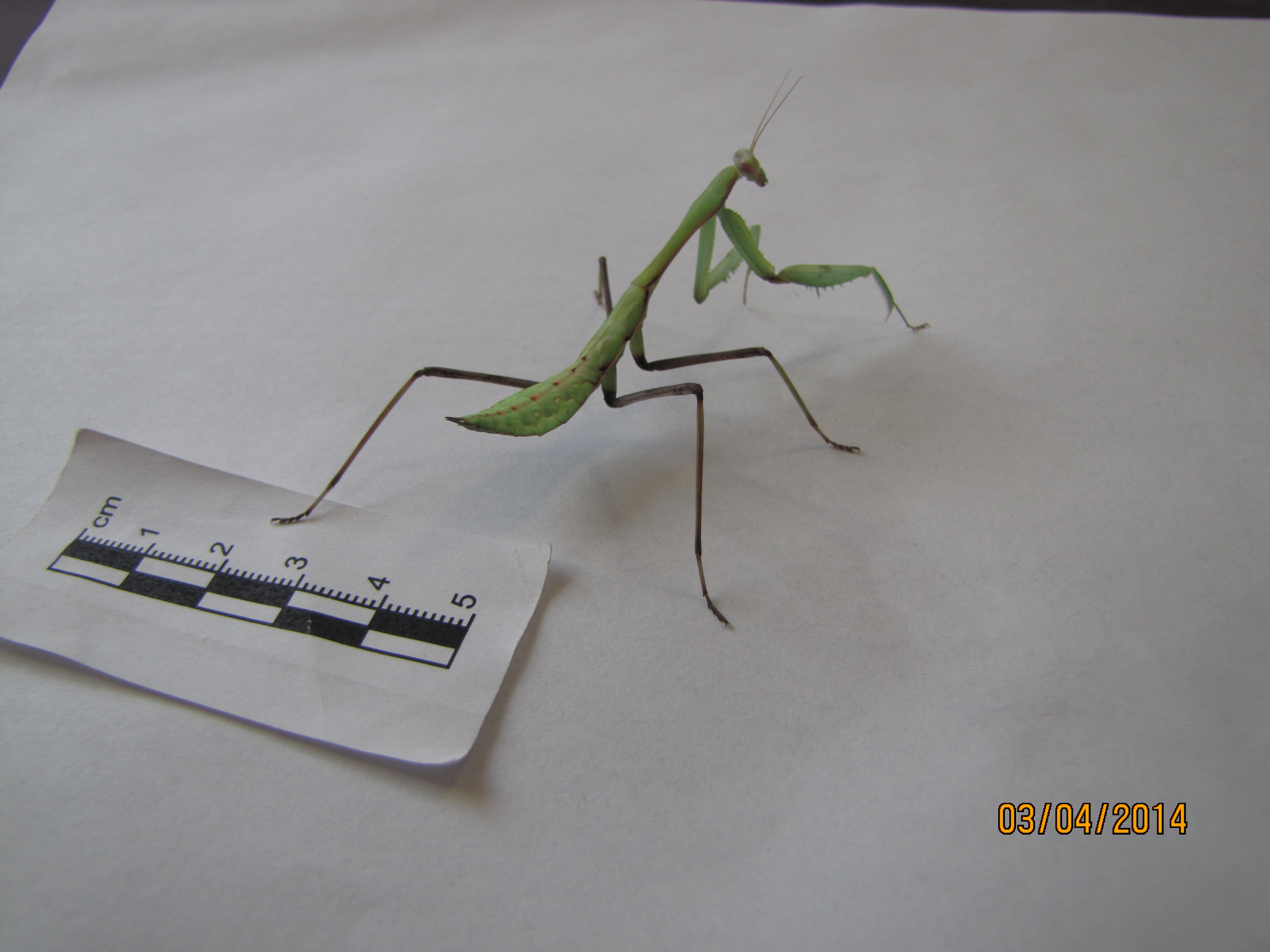
male nymph L7

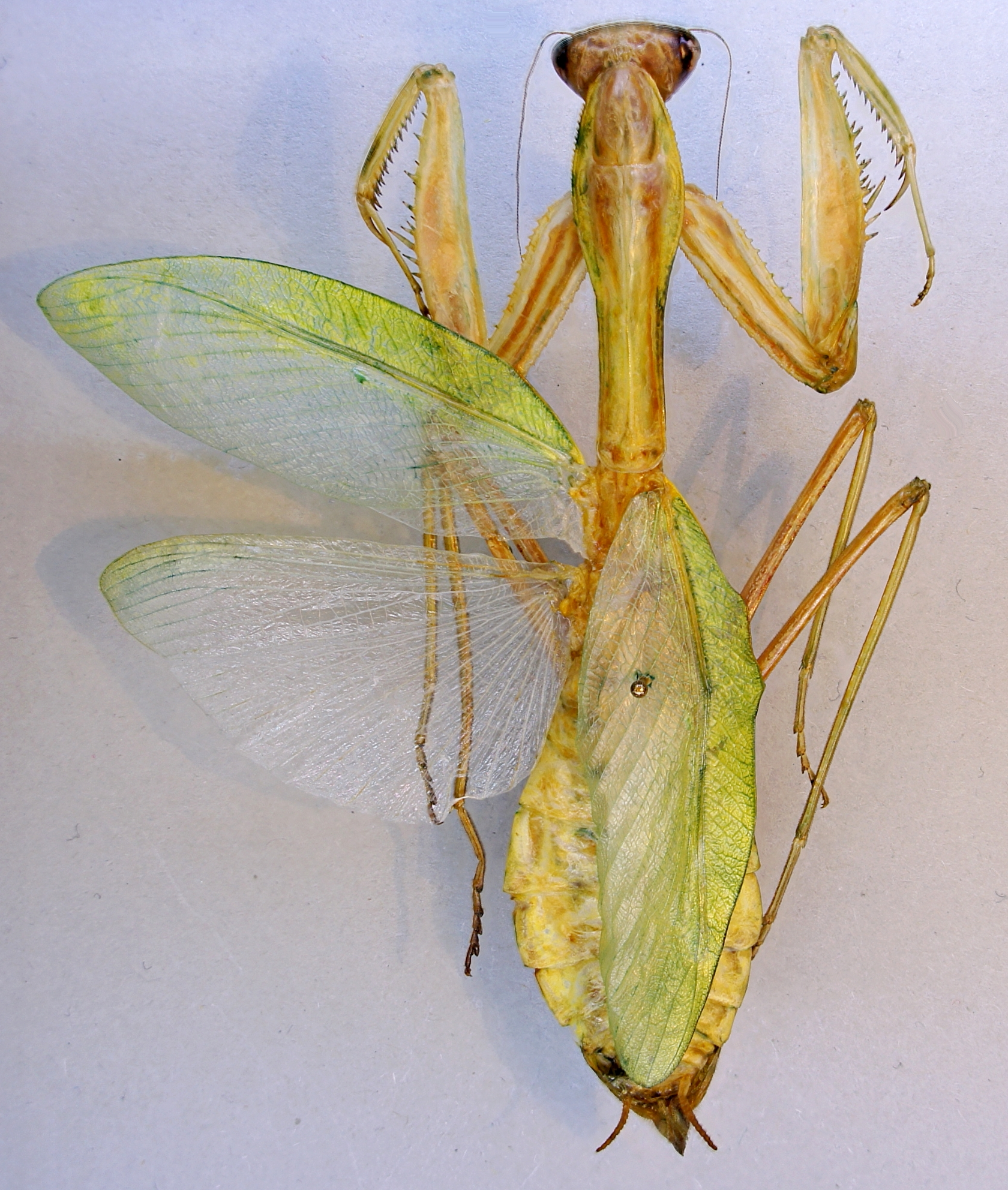
pinned specimen

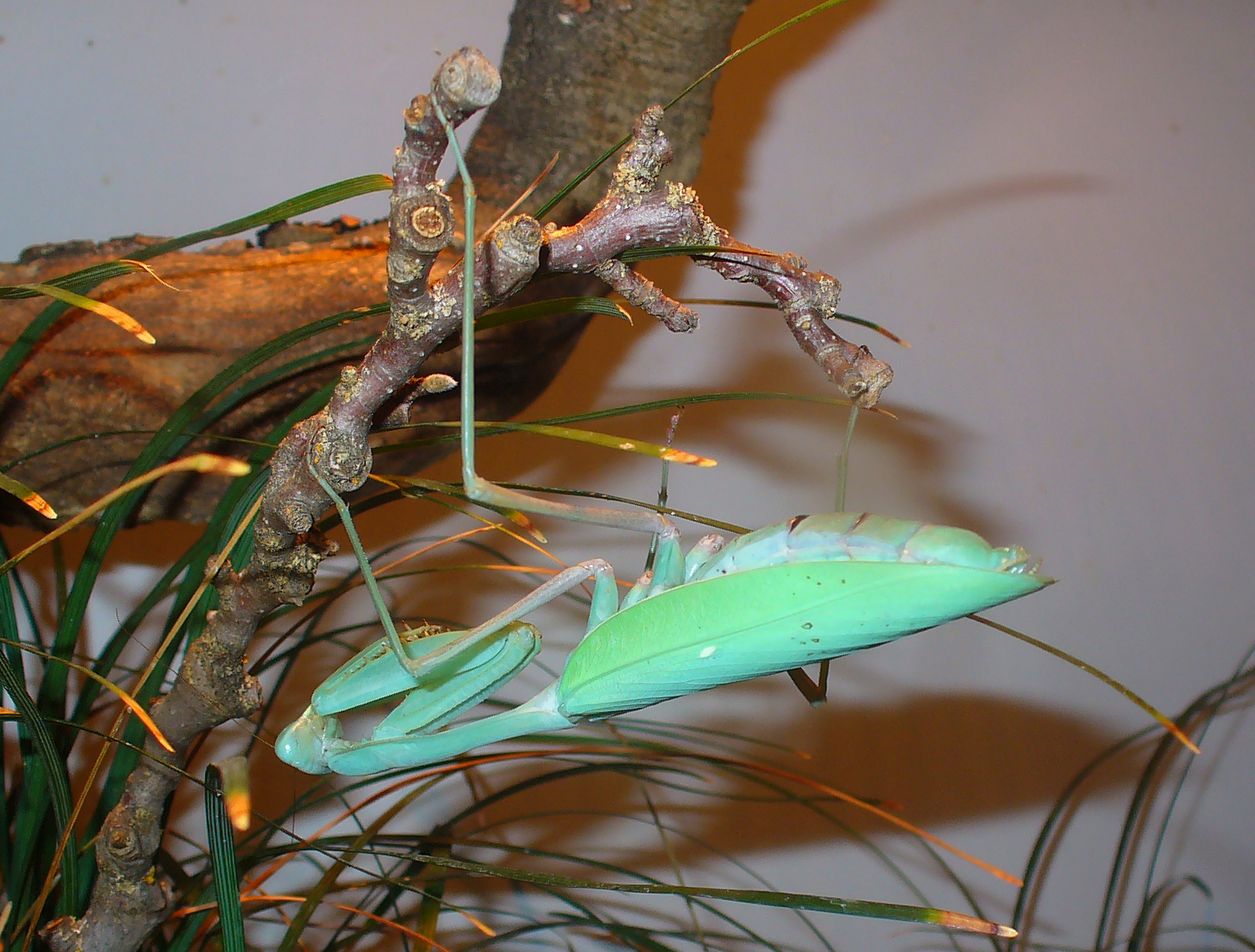
Adult female

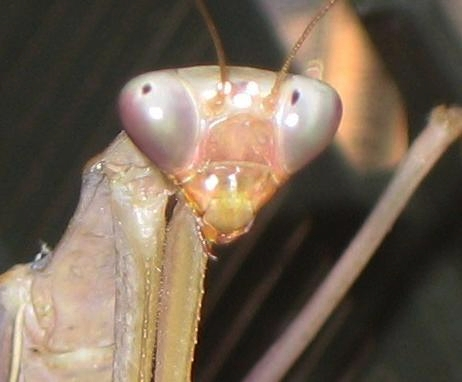
head

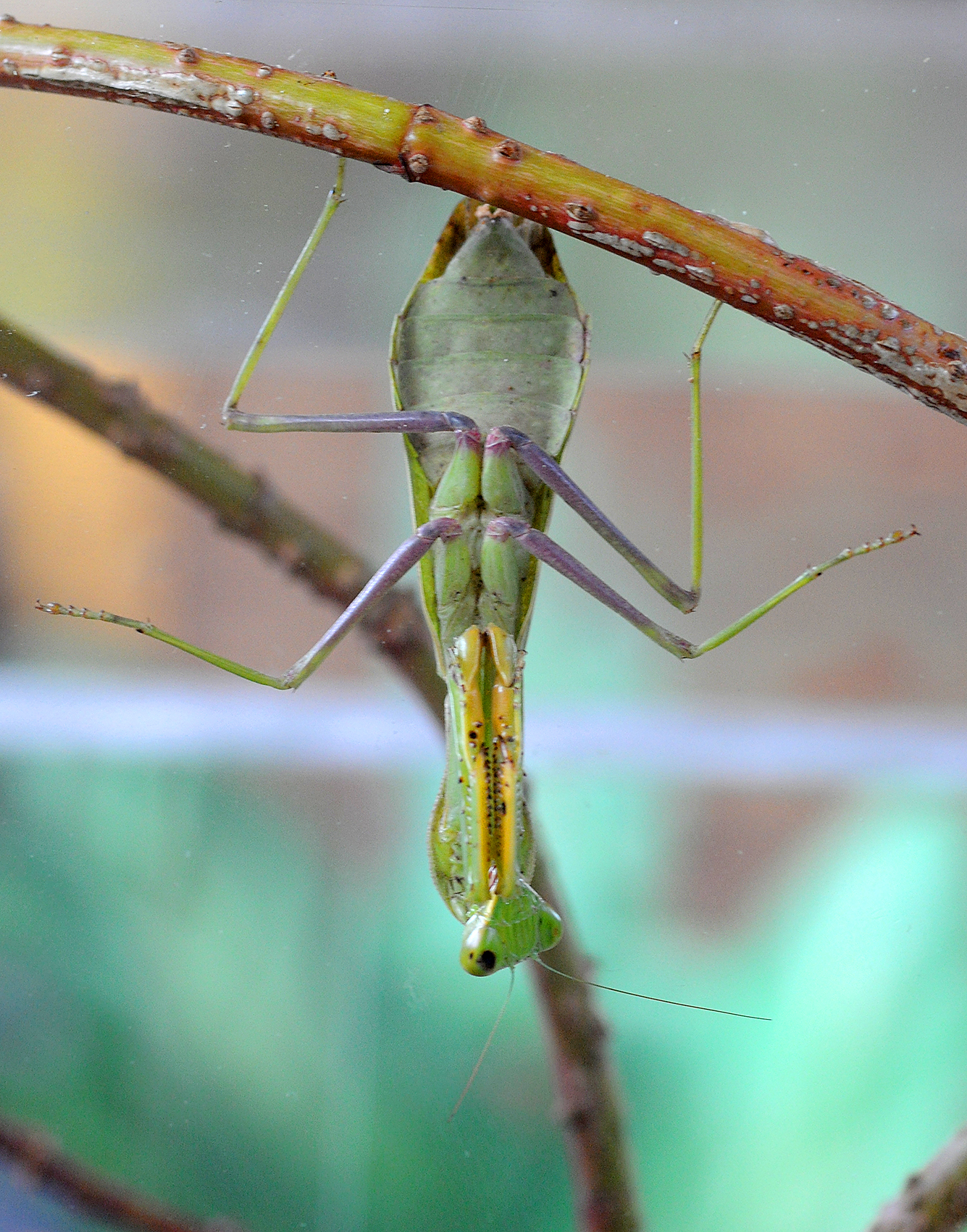
underside

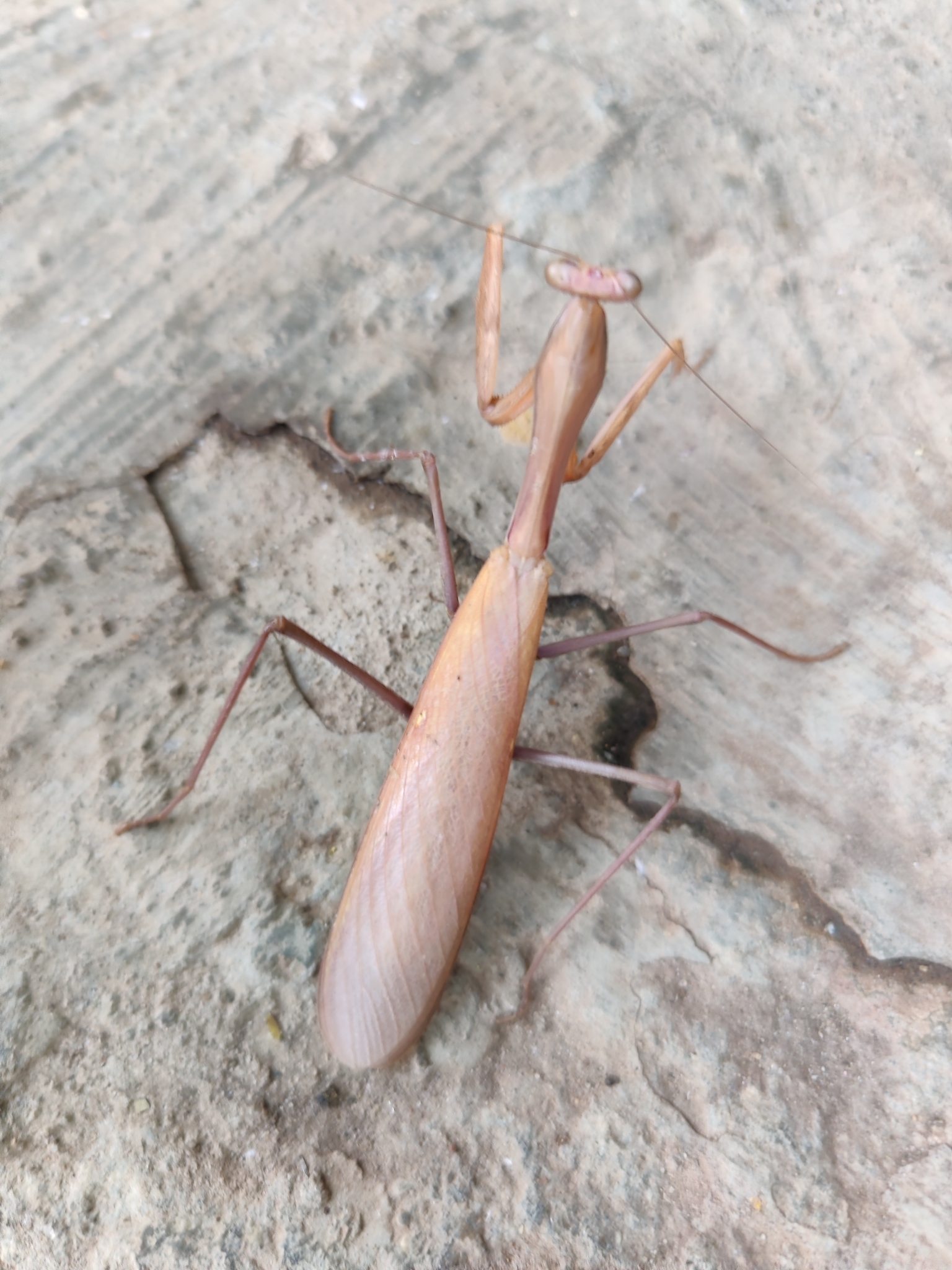
Adult male

== See also ==
- List of mantis species and genera
