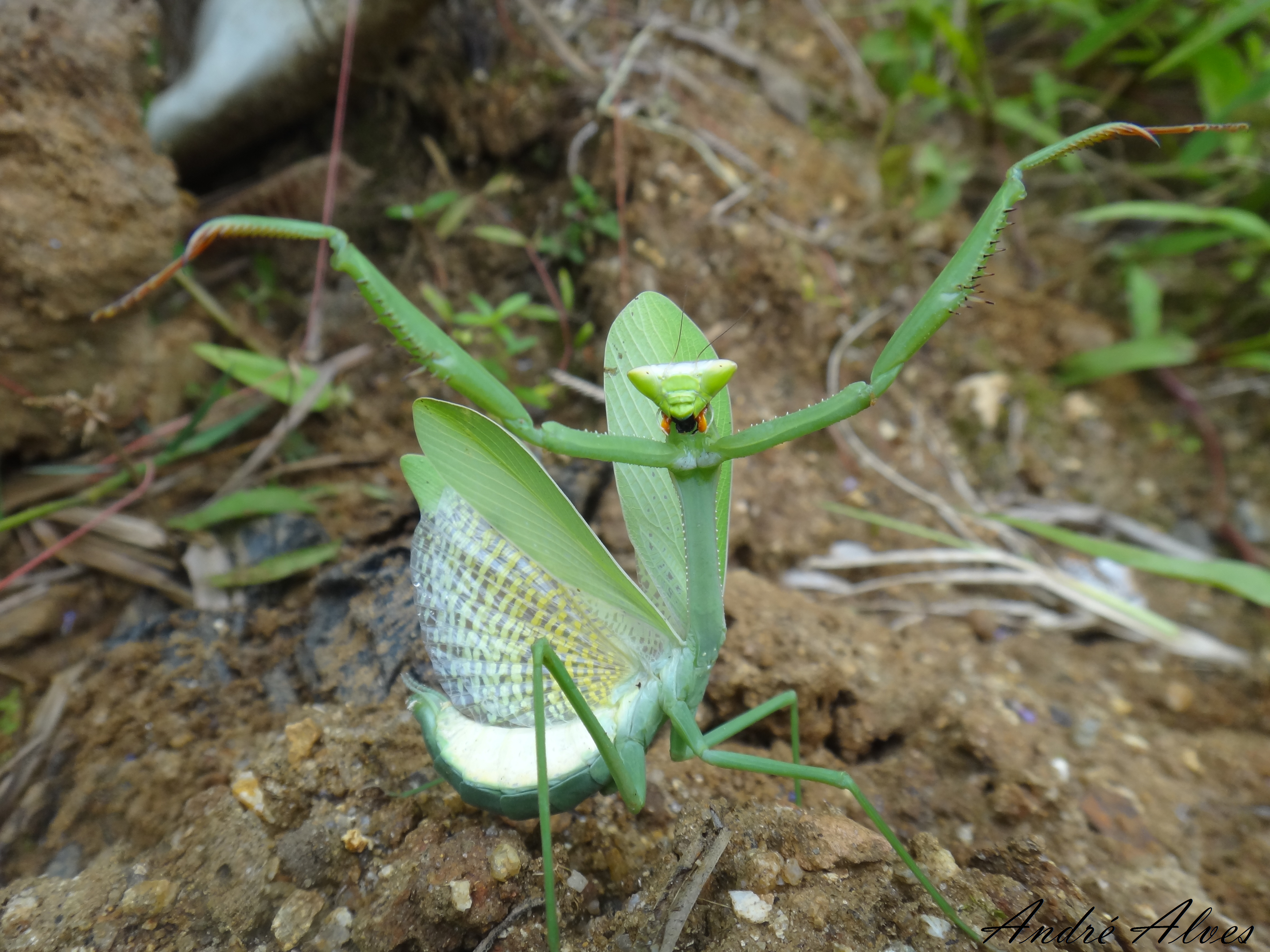
- Oxyopsis sp.

Scientific classification
- Kingdom: Animalia
- Phylum: Arthropoda
- Clade: Pancrustacea
- Class: Insecta
- Order: Mantodea
- Family: Mantidae
- Tribe: Oxyopsidini
- Genus: Oxyopsis; Caudell, 1904

Species
- Oxyopsis acutipennis; Oxyopsis festae; Oxyopsis gracilis; Oxyopsis lobeter; Oxyopsis media; Oxyopsis obtusa; Oxyopsis oculea; Oxyopsis peruviana; Oxyopsis rubicunda; Oxyopsis saussurei; Oxyopsis stali

Synonyms
- Oxyops Saussure, 1869

= Oxyopsis =

Genus of praying mantises

Oxyopsis is a genus consisting of 11 species of mantises in the subfamily Vatinae.

== See also ==
- List of mantis genera and species
