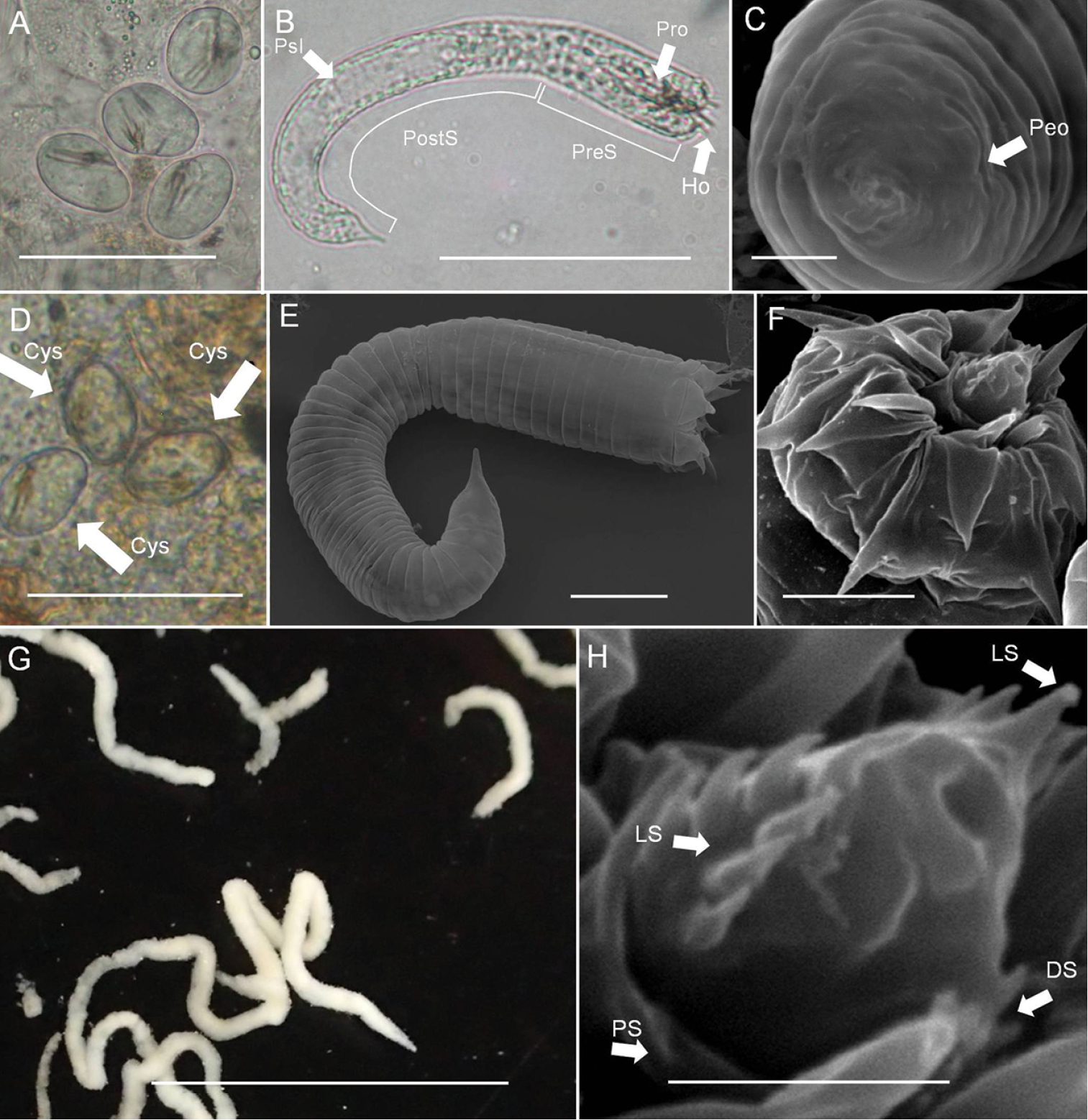
- Acutogordius taiwanensis

Scientific classification
- Kingdom: Animalia
- Phylum: Nematomorpha
- Class: Gordioida
- Order: Gordioidea
- Family: Gordiidae
- Genus: Acutogordius; Heinze, 1952

= Acutogordius =

Genus of horsehair worms

Acutogordius is a genus of worms belonging to the family Gordiidae.

The species of this genus are found in Northern America, Malesia.

== Species ==
IRMNG lists the following species:

- Acutogordius acuminatus de Miralles & de Villalobos, 1998
- Acutogordius americanus de Miralles & de Villalobos, 1998
- Acutogordius australiensis Spiridonov, 1984
- Acutogordius doriae (Camerano, 1890)
- Acutogordius feae Heinze, 1952
- Acutogordius incertus Heinze, 1952
- Acutogordius obesus (Camerano, 1895)
- Acutogordius olivetti Schmidt-Rhaesa & Piper, 2021
- Acutogordius protectus Schmidt-Rhaesa & Geraci, 2006
- Acutogordius sulawensis Schmidt-Rhaesa & Geraci, 2006
- Acutogordius taiwanensis Chiu, Huang, Wu & Shiao, 2017
