= Oxyopsis gracilis =

Scientific classification
- Kingdom: Animalia
- Phylum: Arthropoda
- Clade: Pancrustacea
- Class: Insecta
- Order: Mantodea
- Family: Mantidae
- Genus: Oxyopsis
- Species: O. gracilis

Binomial name
- Oxyopsis gracilis Giglio-Tos, 1914

Species of praying mantis

Oxyopsis gracilis, the South American green mantis, is a species of praying mantis native to South America. It is a medium sized mantis with adult females reaching 3” in length and adult males growing to about 1.5” in length. Individuals of these species are usually bright green.

== See also ==
- List of mantis genera and species
