= Bantiella trinitatis =

Scientific classification
- Kingdom: Animalia
- Phylum: Arthropoda
- Clade: Pancrustacea
- Class: Insecta
- Order: Mantodea
- Family: Thespidae
- Genus: Bantiella
- Species: B. trinitatis

Binomial name
- Bantiella trinitatis Giglio-Tos, 1915

Species of praying mantis

Bantiella trinitatis is a species of praying mantis in the family Thespidae. It occurs in Trinidad and Tobago, Guyana, and Venezuela. There is also an older record from Martinique.

== See also ==
- List of mantis genera and species
