= Stagmatoptera pia =

Scientific classification
- Domain: Eukaryota
- Kingdom: Animalia
- Phylum: Arthropoda
- Class: Insecta
- Order: Mantodea
- Family: Mantidae
- Genus: Stagmatoptera
- Species: S. pia

Binomial name
- Stagmatoptera pia Saussure & Zehntner, 1894

Synonyms
- Stagmatoptera nova Beier, 1930

Species of praying mantis

Stagmatoptera pia is a species of praying mantis in the family Mantidae.

== See also ==
- List of mantis genera and species
