= Catoxyopsis =

Catoxyopsis dubiosa

Scientific classification
- Kingdom: Animalia
- Phylum: Arthropoda
- Clade: Pancrustacea
- Class: Insecta
- Order: Mantodea
- Family: Mantidae
- Genus: Catoxyopsis; Giglio-Tos, 1914
- Species: C. dubiosa

Binomial name
- Catoxyopsis dubiosa (Giglio-Tos, 1898)

Genus of praying mantises

Catoxyopsis is a genus of mantis in the subfamily Vatinae. It consists of a single species, Catoxyopsis dubiosa.

== See also ==
- List of mantis genera and species
