= Lobocneme =

Scientific classification
- Kingdom: Animalia
- Phylum: Arthropoda
- Clade: Pancrustacea
- Class: Insecta
- Order: Mantodea
- Family: Mantidae
- Subfamily: Vatinae
- Genus: Lobocneme; Rehn, 1911

Synonyms
- Paroxyopsis Rehn, 1911

Genus of praying mantises

Lobocneme is a genus consisting of 3 species of mantises in the tribe Oxyopsidini.

== Species ==
The Mantodea Species File lists:

- Lobocneme colombiae Hebard, 1919
- Lobocneme icterica Saussure & Zehntner, 1894
- Lobocneme lobipes Brunner & Redtenbacher, 1892

== See also ==
- List of mantis genera and species
