= Stagmatoptera abdominalis =

Scientific classification
- Domain: Eukaryota
- Kingdom: Animalia
- Phylum: Arthropoda
- Class: Insecta
- Order: Mantodea
- Family: Mantidae
- Genus: Stagmatoptera
- Species: S. abdominalis

Binomial name
- Stagmatoptera abdominalis Olivier, 1792

Synonyms
- Stagmatoptera urbana Lichtenstein, 1802

Species of praying mantis

Stagmatoptera abdominalis is a species of praying mantis in the family Mantidae.

== See also ==
- List of mantis genera and species
