= Stagmatoptera precaria =

Scientific classification
- Kingdom: Animalia
- Phylum: Arthropoda
- Clade: Pancrustacea
- Class: Insecta
- Order: Mantodea
- Family: Mantidae
- Genus: Stagmatoptera
- Species: S. precaria

Binomial name
- Stagmatoptera precaria (Linneaeus, 1758)

Synonyms
- Gryllus precarius Linnaeus, 1758; Stagmatoptera annulata Stoll, 1813; Stagmatoptera obsecraria Lichtenstein, 1802; Stagmatoptera octosetosa Goeze, 1778; Stagmatoptera rogatoria Stoll, 1813

Species of praying mantis

Stagmatoptera precaria is a species of praying mantis in the family Mantidae.

== See also ==
- List of mantis genera and species
