= Stagmatoptera septentrionalis =

Scientific classification
- Domain: Eukaryota
- Kingdom: Animalia
- Phylum: Arthropoda
- Class: Insecta
- Order: Mantodea
- Family: Mantidae
- Genus: Stagmatoptera
- Species: S. septentrionalis

Binomial name
- Stagmatoptera septentrionalis Saussure & Zehntner

Synonyms
- Stagmatoptera incerta Giglio-Tos, 1914; Stagmatoptera minor Saussure & Zehntner, 1894

Species of praying mantis

Stagmatoptera septentrionalis is a species of praying mantis in the family Mantidae.

== See also ==
- List of mantis genera and species
