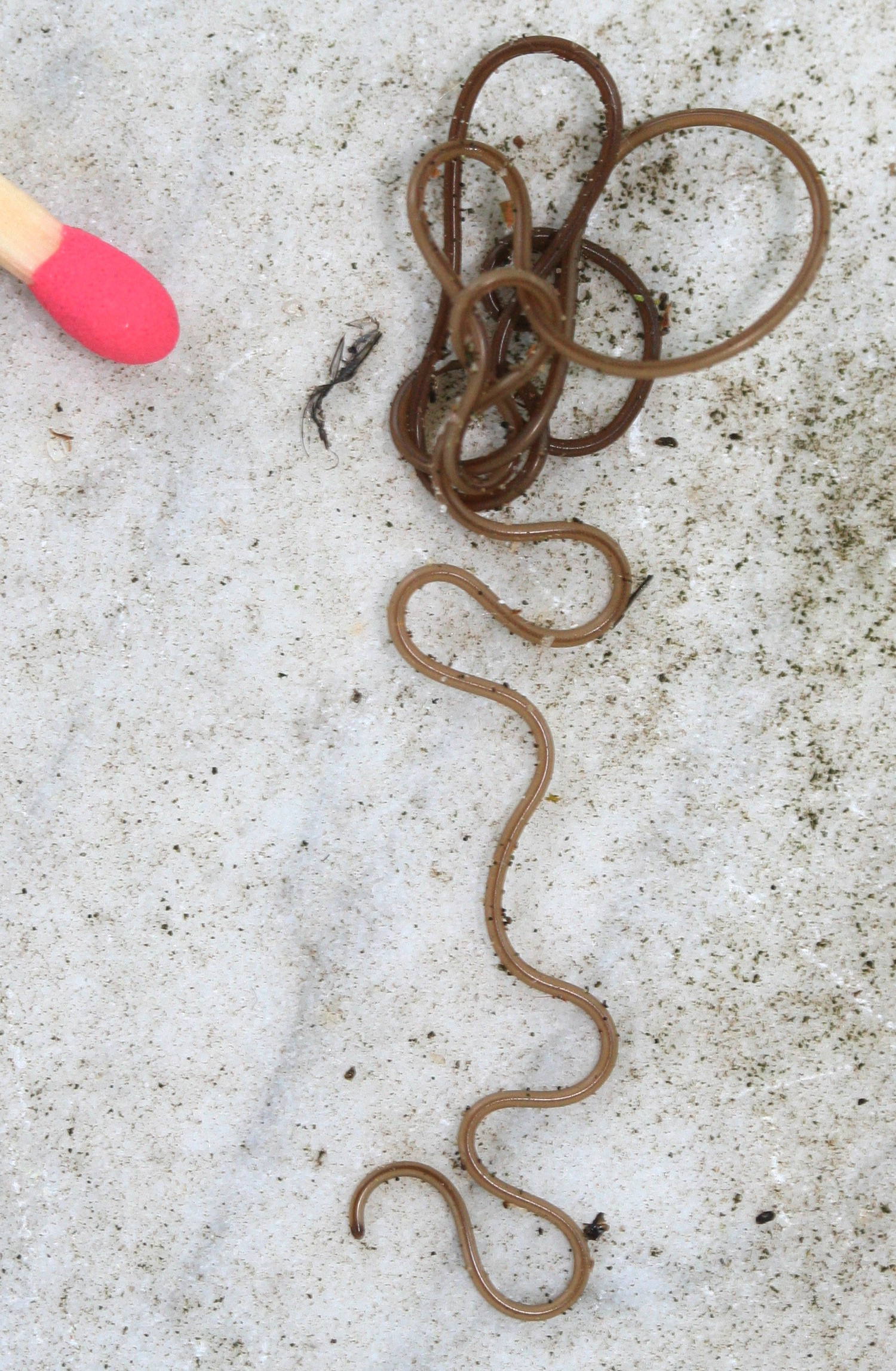
- Gordius aquaticus

Scientific classification
- Domain: Eukaryota
- Kingdom: Animalia
- Phylum: Nematomorpha
- Class: Gordioida
- Order: Gordioidea
- Family: Gordiidae; May, 1919

= Gordiidae =

Family of parasitic horsehair worms

Gordiidae is a family of parasitic horsehair worms belonging to the order Gordioidea.

== Description ==
To date only two genera have been identified in the Gordiidae. These horsehair worms are characterized by a post-cloacal crescent located at the base of the two tail lobes. The genera are distinguished by the distinctly pointed tips on male Acutogordius tail lobes in comparison with Gordius. Recorded hosts are usually Polyneopteran insects such as Orthoptera and Mantodea.

== Genera ==
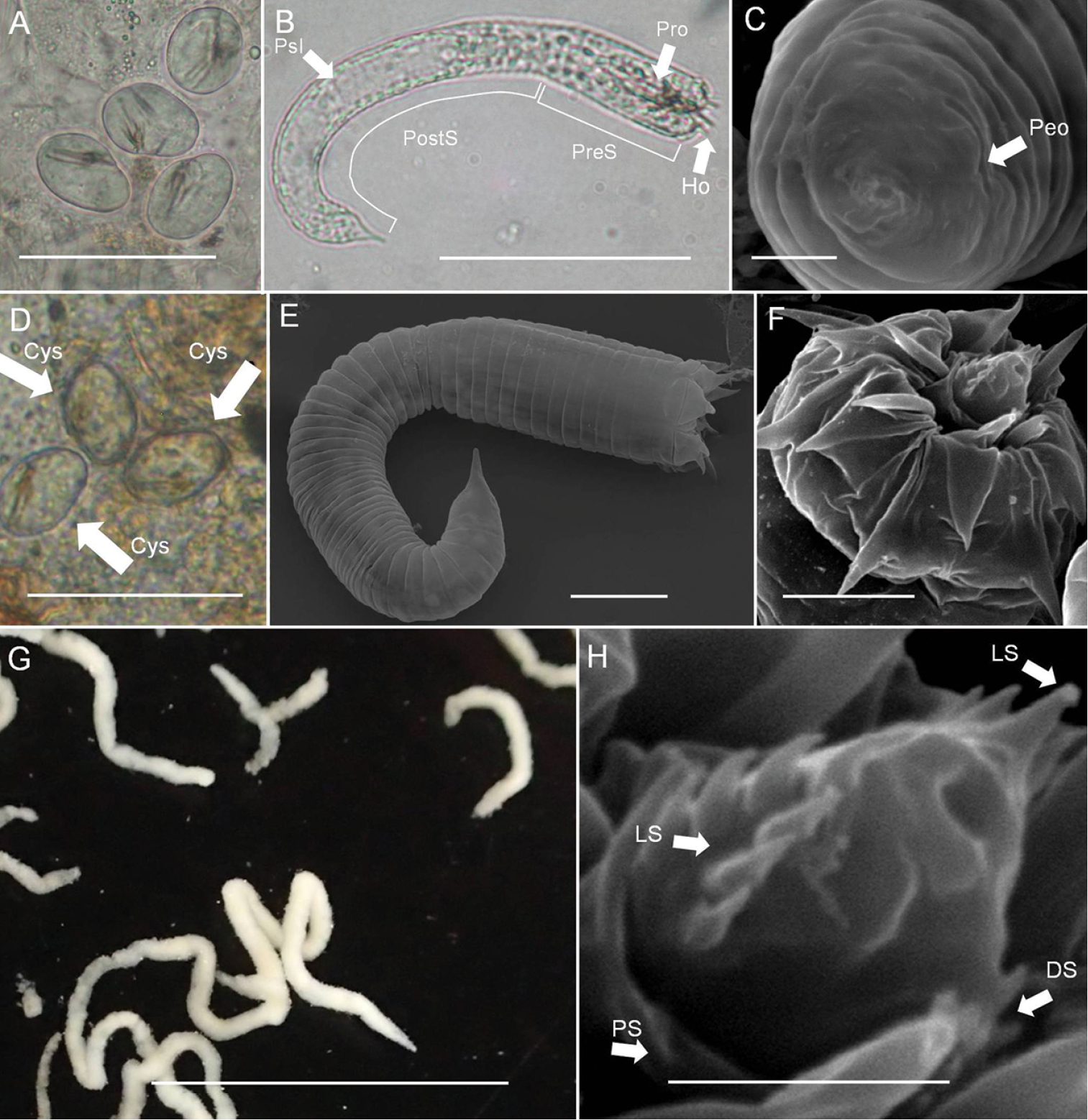
Acutogordius taiwanensis

The Global Biodiversity Information Facility lists:

1. Acutogordius Heinze, 1952
2. Gordius Linnaeus, 1758
