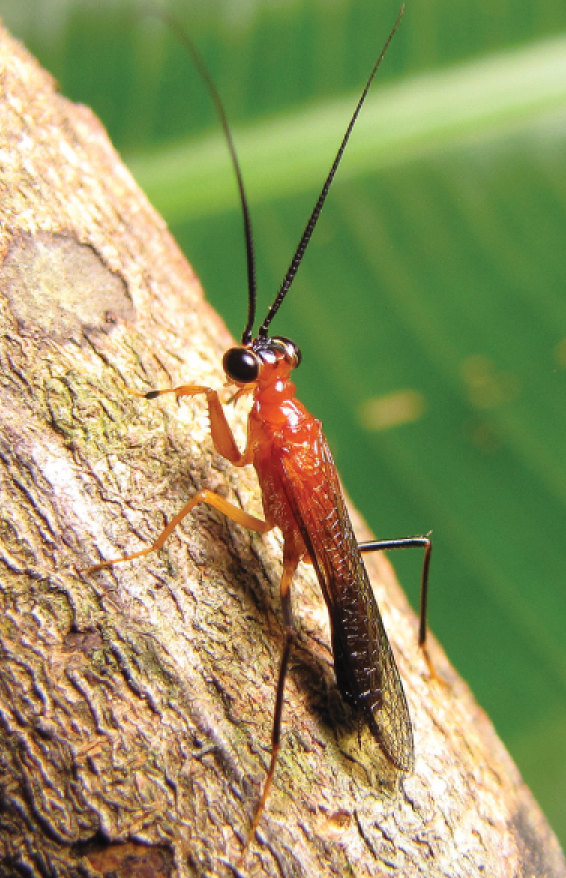
- Vespamantoida wherley

Scientific classification
- Kingdom: Animalia
- Phylum: Arthropoda
- Clade: Pancrustacea
- Class: Insecta
- Order: Mantodea
- Infraorder: Spinomantodea; Schwarz & Roy, 2019
- Superfamily: Mantoidoidea
- Family: Mantoididae; Giglio-Tos, 1927

Genera
- See text

= Mantoididae =

Mantoididae Temporal range: Eocene–Recent

Family of praying mantises

Mantoididae is a family of mantises which contains Neotropical species of praying mantises from tropical North and South America. The family was formerly represented by the sole genus Mantoida, until the genus Paramantoida was described in 2014 and Vespamantoida in 2019. The family differs from the closely related Chaeteessidae in having an apical claw on the fore tibiae which are also less curved. Males have ocelli and a cylindrical body shape, unlike the dorsoventrally flattened Chaeteessidae. The cerci are also shorter.

== Genera ==
The following genera are placed in the family Mantoididae:

- Mantoida Newman, 1838 - 11 species
- Paramantoida Agudelo, 2014 - 1 species, Paramantoida amazonica, typically dark colored with white spots resembling certain wasps
- Vespamantoida Svenson & Rodrigues, 2019 - 2 species, resemble some ichneumonid wasps
- †Pseudomantoida Schubnel and Nel, 2019 - Oise amber, France, Eocene (Ypresian)
