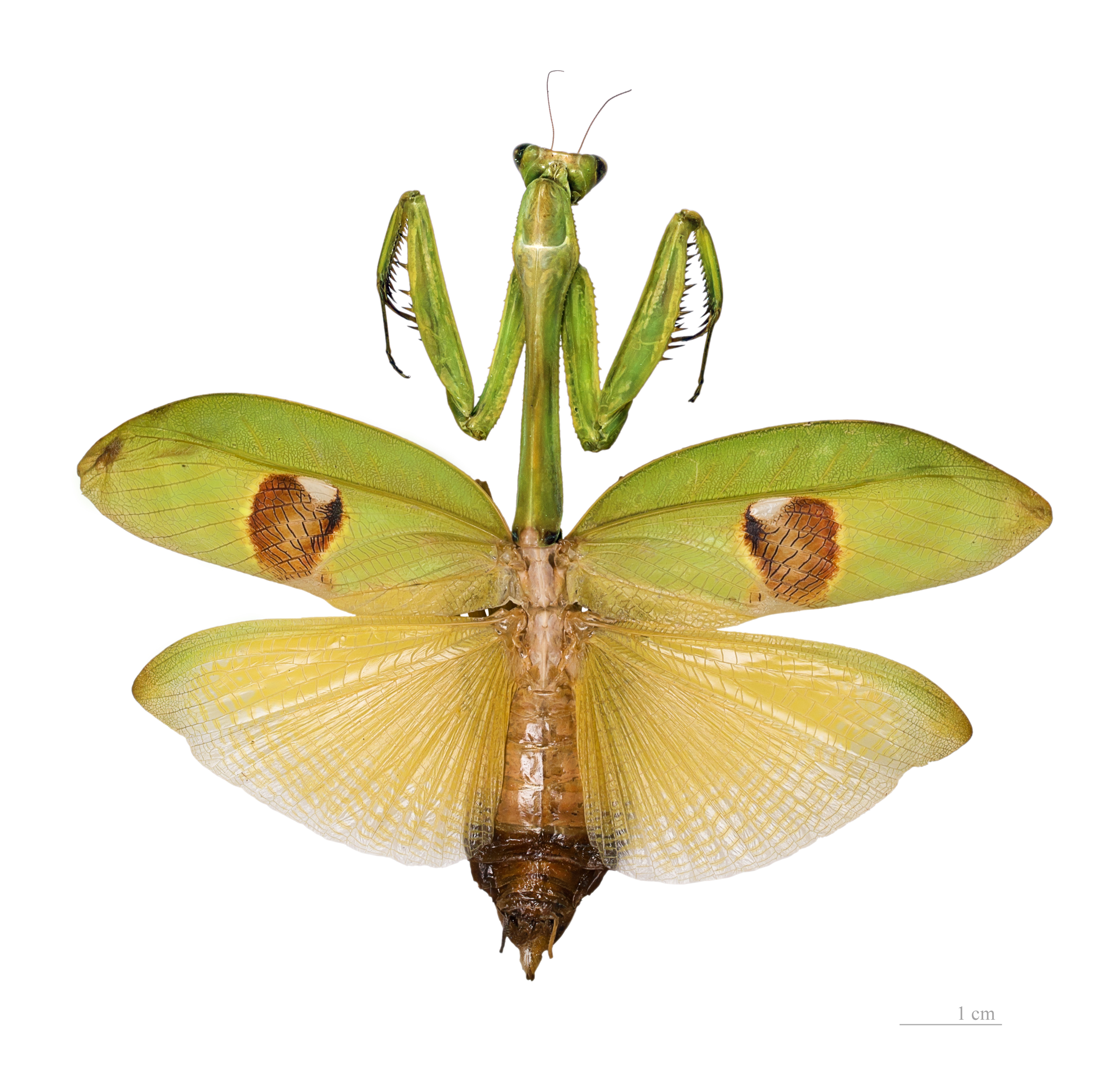
- Adult female Stagmatoptera supplicaria

Scientific classification
- Kingdom: Animalia
- Phylum: Arthropoda
- Clade: Pancrustacea
- Class: Insecta
- Order: Mantodea
- Family: Mantidae
- Subfamily: Vatinae
- Tribe: Stagmatopterini
- Genus: Stagmatoptera; Burmeister, 1838

= Stagmatoptera =

Genus of praying mantises

Stagmatoptera is a genus consisting of 14 species of mantises in the monotypic tribe Stagmatopterini, that inhabit the Neotropical region.

== Species ==
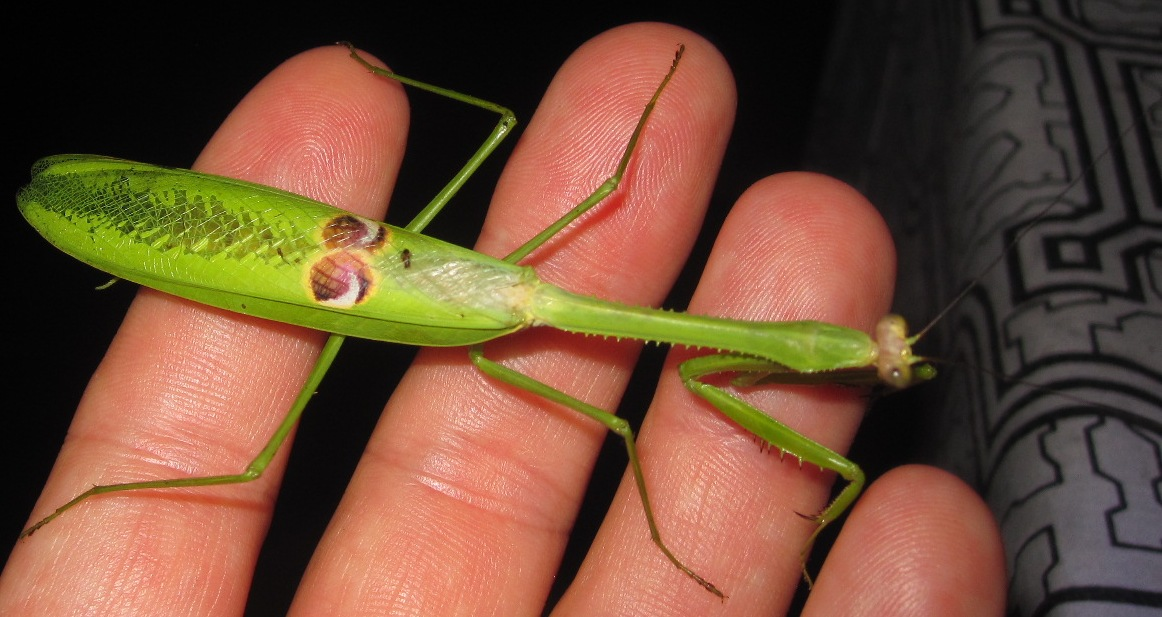
Adult male Stagmatoptera binotata in the Amazon rainforest near Nauta, Peru

- Stagmatoptera abdominalis
- Stagmatoptera binotata
- Stagmatoptera biocellata
- Stagmatoptera cerdai
- Stagmatoptera diana
- Stagmatoptera femoralis
- Stagmatoptera hyaloptera (Argentine white crested mantis)
- Stagmatoptera indicator
- Stagmatoptera luna
- Stagmatoptera pia
- Stagmatoptera praecaria
- Stagmatoptera reimoseri
- Stagmatoptera septentrionalis
- Stagmatoptera supplicaria

== See also ==
- List of mantis genera and species
