= Chopardiella latipennis =

Scientific classification
- Domain: Eukaryota
- Kingdom: Animalia
- Phylum: Arthropoda
- Class: Insecta
- Order: Mantodea
- Family: Mantidae
- Genus: Chopardiella
- Species: C. latipennis

Binomial name
- Chopardiella latipennis Chopard, 1911

Synonyms
- Stagmomantis amazonica (Jantsch, 1985); Stagmomantis paraensis (Jantsch, 1985); Uromantis amazonica Jantsch, 1985; Uromantis paraensis Jantsch, 1985

Species of praying mantis

Chopardiella latipennis, common name Amazon mantis, is a species of praying mantis in the family Mantidae. They are native to South America.
