= Alalomantis coxalis =

Scientific classification
- Domain: Eukaryota
- Kingdom: Animalia
- Phylum: Arthropoda
- Class: Insecta
- Order: Mantodea
- Family: Mantidae
- Genus: Alalomantis
- Species: A. coxalis

Binomial name
- Alalomantis coxalis (Saussure & Zehntner, 1895)

Synonyms
- Hierodula coxalis Saussure & Zehntner, 1895

Species of praying mantis

Alalomantis coxalis is a species of praying mantis in the family Mantidae.

== See also ==
- List of mantis genera and species
