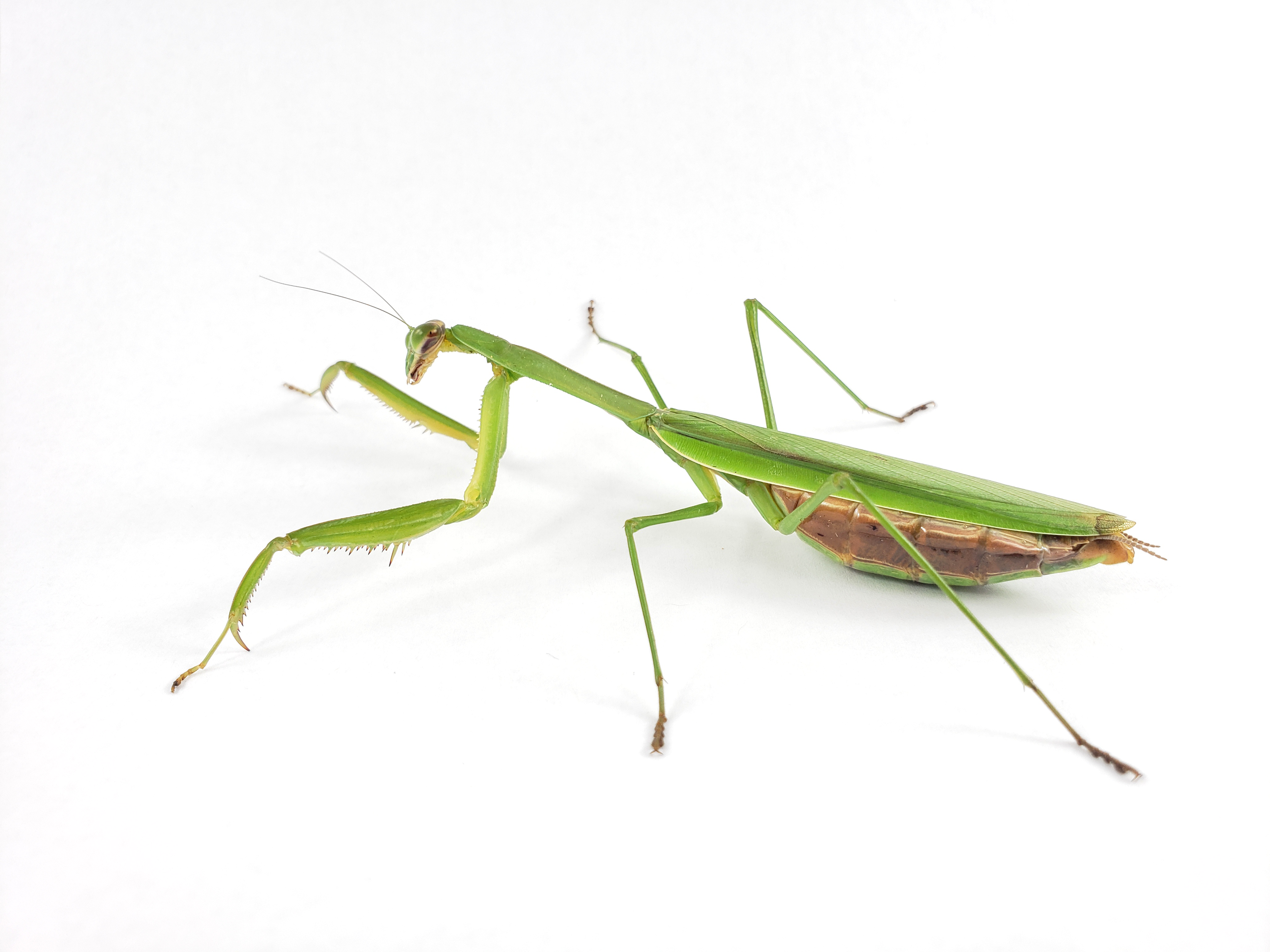
- Tenodera sinensis

Scientific classification
- Kingdom: Animalia
- Phylum: Arthropoda
- Clade: Pancrustacea
- Class: Insecta
- Order: Mantodea
- Family: Mantidae
- Subfamily: Tenoderinae; Brunner von Wattenwyl, 1893

= Tenoderinae =

Subfamily of praying mantises

The Tenoderinae are a subfamily of praying mantids, originally used by Brunner von Wattenwyl. It was restored as part of a major revision of mantid taxonomy, and contains many genera previously placed in the subfamily Mantinae.

The new placement means that this taxon is part of the superfamily Mantoidea (of group Cernomantodea) and infraorder Schizomantodea. Species have been recorded from: Africa, Europe and Asia.

== Tribes and genera ==
This new subfamily now contains many genera that were previously placed elsewhere including the Mantinae. The Mantodea Species File lists two tribes here:

=== Paramantini ===
subtribe Paramantina

- Alalomantis Giglio-Tos, 1917
- Epitenodera Giglio-Tos, 1911
- Paramantis Ragge & Roy, 1967
- Rhomboderella Giglio-Tos, 1912
- Sphodromantis Stal, 1871

subtribe Tarachomantina

- Mantasoa Mériguet, 2005
- Nausicaamantis Meriguet, 2018
- Tarachomantis Brancsik, 1892
- Tisma Giglio-Tos, 1917

=== Tenoderini ===
subtribe Polyspilotina

- Cataspilota Giglio-Tos, 1917
- Plistospilota Giglio-Tos, 1911
- Polyspilota Burmeister, 1838
- Prohierodula Bolivar, 1908

subtribe Tenoderina

- Mesopteryx Saussure, 1870
- Notomantis Tindale, 1923
- Tenodera Burmeister, 1838
- Tenomaculosa Tarapipattanakun & Unnahachote, 2025
- Tenospilota Roy & Ehrmann, 2014
