= Rhombomantis butleri =

Scientific classification
- Kingdom: Animalia
- Phylum: Arthropoda
- Clade: Pancrustacea
- Class: Insecta
- Order: Mantodea
- Family: Mantidae
- Subfamily: Hierodulinae
- Tribe: Hierodulini
- Genus: Rhombomantis
- Species: R. butleri

Binomial name
- Rhombomantis butleri (Wood-Mason, 1878)

Species of praying mantis

Rhombomantis butleri is a species of mantid in the family Mantidae. It is native to Asia.
