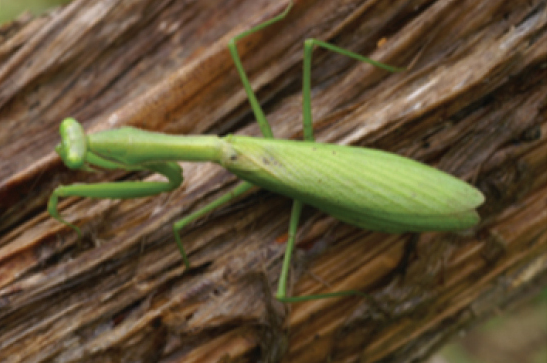

Scientific classification
- Kingdom: Animalia
- Phylum: Arthropoda
- Clade: Pancrustacea
- Class: Insecta
- Order: Mantodea
- Family: Mantidae
- Genus: Alalomantis
- Species: A. muta

Binomial name
- Alalomantis muta Wood-Mason, 1889

= Alalomantis muta =

Species of praying mantis

Alalomantis muta, common name Cameroon mantis, is a species of praying mantis native to West Africa.

== See also ==
- List of mantis genera and species
