= Rhombomantis tectiformis =

Scientific classification
- Kingdom: Animalia
- Phylum: Arthropoda
- Clade: Pancrustacea
- Class: Insecta
- Order: Mantodea
- Family: Mantidae
- Subfamily: Hierodulinae
- Tribe: Hierodulini
- Genus: Rhombomantis
- Species: R. tectiformis

Binomial name
- Rhombomantis tectiformis (Saussure, 1870)

Species of praying mantis

Rhombomantis tectiformis is a species of mantid in the family Mantidae. It is found in Asia.
