= Mesopteryx =

Mesopteryx may refer to:

- Mesopteryx (bird) Hutton, 1891, a synonym of Emeus, the eastern moa
- Mesopteryx (mantis) Saussure, 1870, a genus of praying mantis
