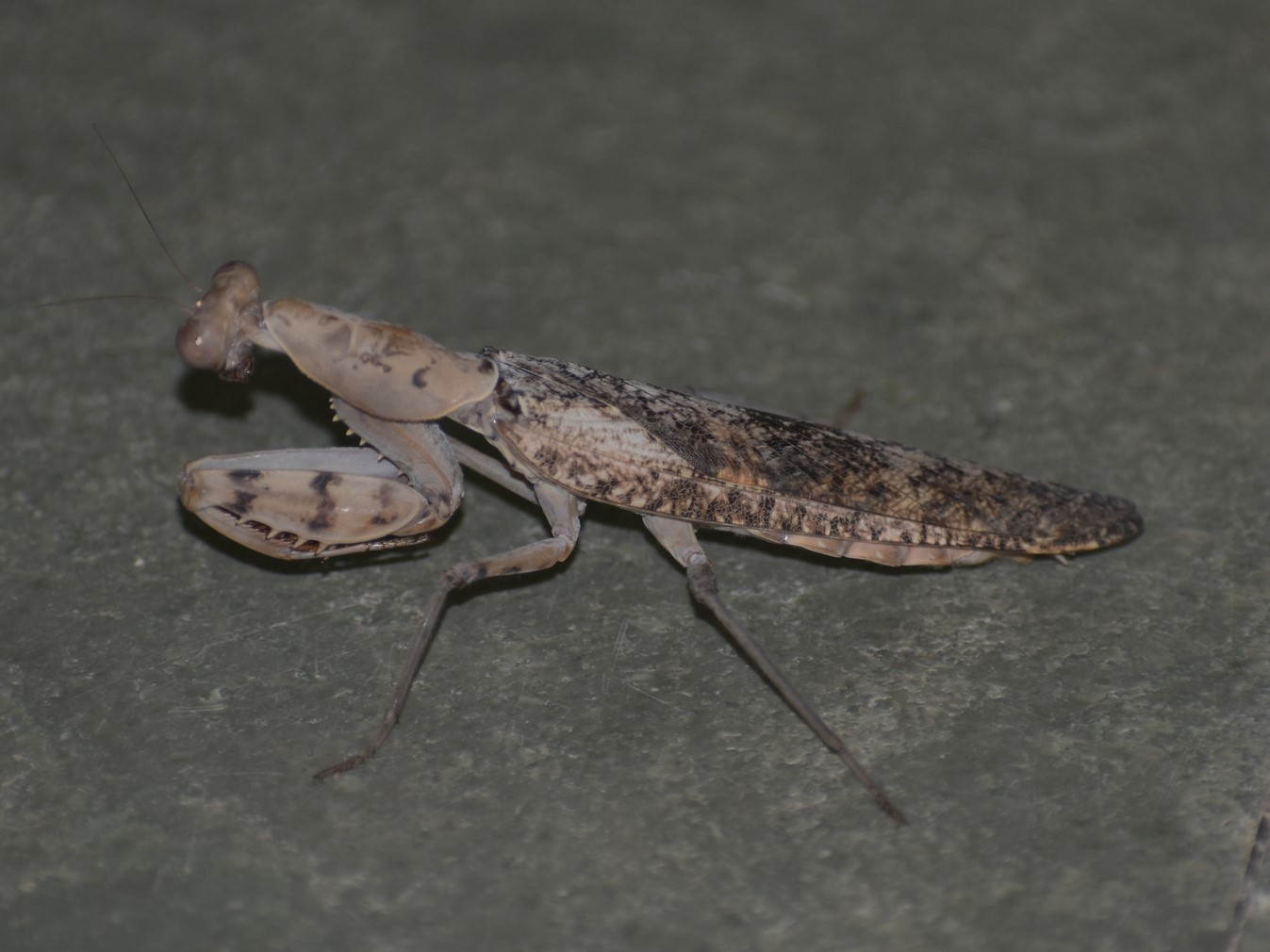

Scientific classification
- Kingdom: Animalia
- Phylum: Arthropoda
- Clade: Pancrustacea
- Class: Insecta
- Order: Mantodea
- Family: Mantidae
- Subfamily: Hierodulinae
- Tribe: Hierodulini
- Genus: Rhombomantis
- Species: R. woodmasoni

Binomial name
- Rhombomantis woodmasoni (Werner, 1931)

= Rhombomantis woodmasoni =

Species of praying mantis

Rhombomantis woodmasoni is a species of mantid in the family Mantidae. It is found in Asia.
