= Chopardiella =

Scientific classification
- Kingdom: Animalia
- Phylum: Arthropoda
- Class: Insecta
- Order: Mantodea
- Family: Mantidae
- Tribe: Pseudoxyopsidini
- Genus: Chopardiella; Giglio-Tos, 1914

Genus of insects

Chopardiella is a genus of mantises belonging to the family Mantidae.

The species of this genus are found in Central America.

Species:

- Chopardiella heterogamia Saussure & Zehntner, 1894
- Chopardiella latipennis Chopard, 1911
- Chopardiella poulaini Lombardo & Agabiti, 2001
