= Rhombomantis =

Scientific classification
- Kingdom: Animalia
- Phylum: Arthropoda
- Class: Insecta
- Order: Mantodea
- Family: Mantidae
- Subfamily: Hierodulinae
- Tribe: Hierodulini
- Genus: Rhombomantis; Ehrmann & Borer, 2015

Genus of praying mantises

Rhombomantis is a genus of mantises in the family Mantidae. There are at least four described species in Rhombomantis.

== Species ==
These four species belong to the genus Rhombomantis:

- Rhombomantis butleri (Wood-Mason, 1878)
- Rhombomantis fusca (Lombardo, 1992)
- Rhombomantis tectiformis (Saussure, 1870)
- Rhombomantis woodmasoni (Werner, 1931)
