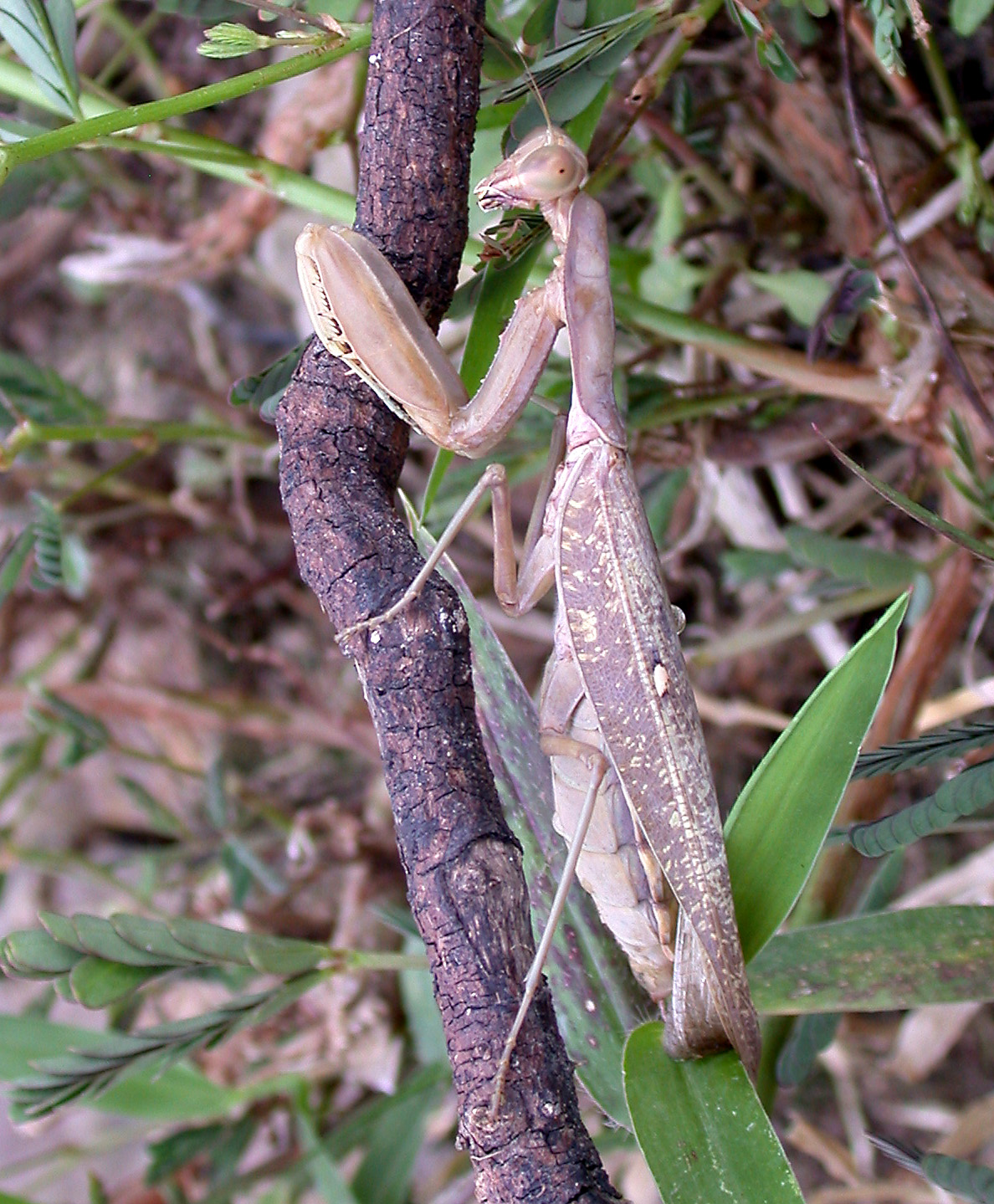

Scientific classification
- Kingdom: Animalia
- Phylum: Arthropoda
- Clade: Pancrustacea
- Class: Insecta
- Order: Mantodea
- Family: Mantidae
- Subfamily: Hierodulinae
- Tribe: Hierodulini
- Genus: Rhombomantis
- Species: R. fusca

Binomial name
- Rhombomantis fusca (Lombardo, 1992)

Synonyms
- Hierodula brachynota (Wang & Dong, 1993)

= Rhombomantis fusca =

Species of praying mantis

Rhombomantis fusca is a species of mantid in the family Mantidae. It is found in Asia.
