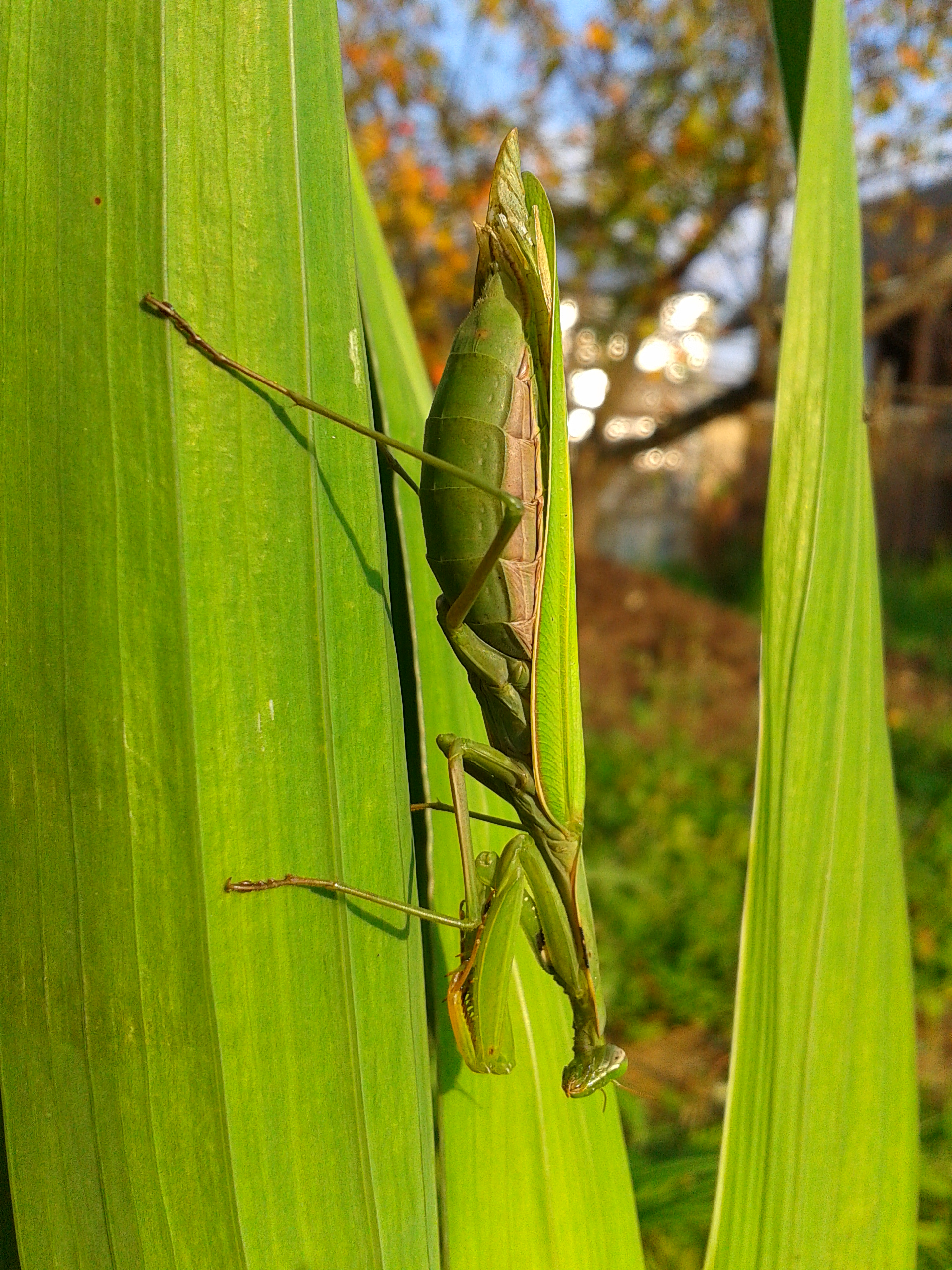
- Mantis religiosa female

Scientific classification
- Kingdom: Animalia
- Phylum: Arthropoda
- Clade: Pancrustacea
- Class: Insecta
- Order: Mantodea
- Family: Mantidae
- Subfamily: Mantinae; Burmeister, 1838

Tribes
- see text

= Mantinae =

Subfamily of praying mantises

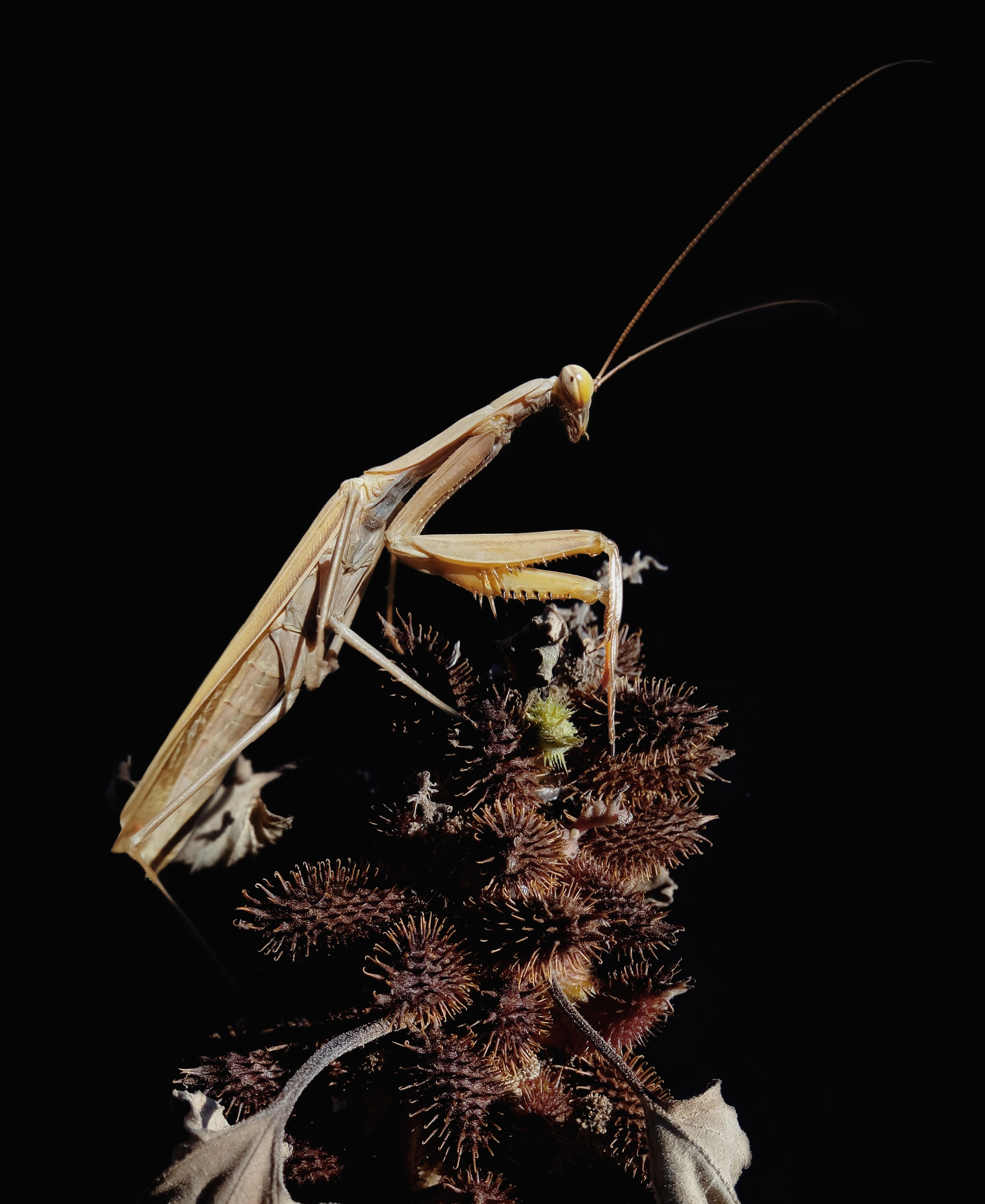
Brown European mantis male

Mantinae is a subfamily of praying mantids of the family Mantidae. It was authored by Hermann Burmeister in 1838.

== Tribes and genera ==
The Mantodea Species File now lists just three genera here, effectively in a single tribe:

=== Mantini ===
- Mantilia - monotypic Mantilia ehrmanni Roy, 1993
- Mantis (Linnaeus, 1758)
- Statilia (Stal, 1877)

=== Tribes moved elsewhere ===
- Archimantini is now in the Hierodulinae
- Paramantini is now in the new subfamily Tenoderinae
- Polyspilotini is now Tenoderini in the Tenoderinae
