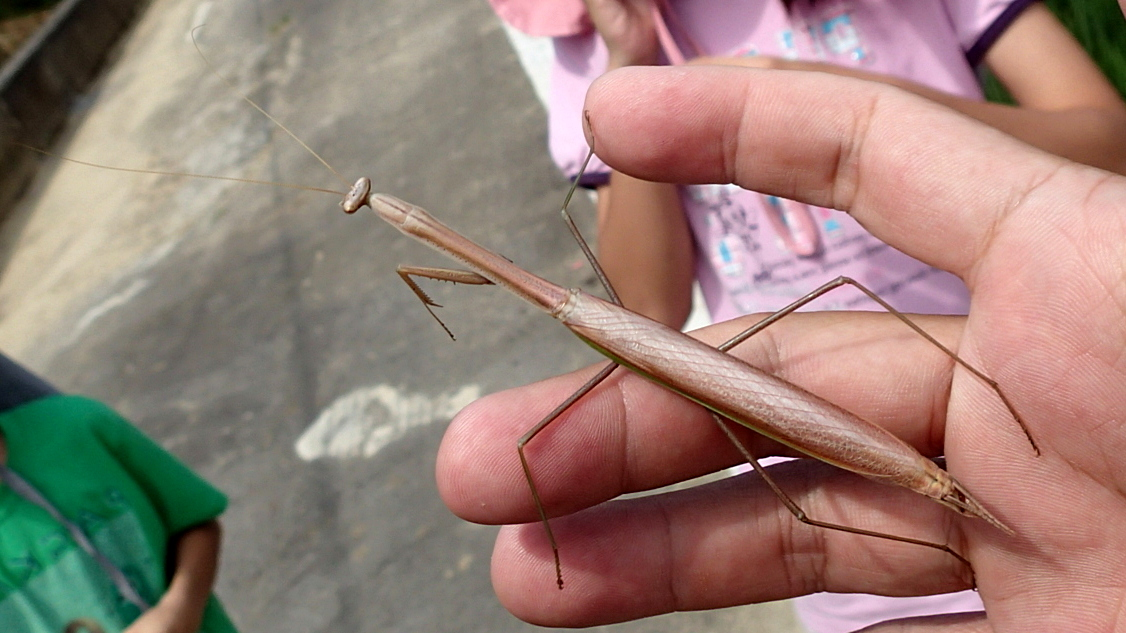
- Mesopteryx alata

Scientific classification
- Kingdom: Animalia
- Phylum: Arthropoda
- Clade: Pancrustacea
- Class: Insecta
- Order: Mantodea
- Family: Mantidae
- Tribe: Tenoderini
- Genus: Mesopteryx; Saussure, 1870

Species
- Mesopteryx alata (Saussure, 1870); Mesopteryx platycephala (Stal, 1877); Mesopteryx robusta (Wood-Mason, 1882)

= Mesopteryx (mantis) =

Genus of praying mantises

Mesopteryx is a genus of mantises in the family Mantidae. It contains three species.

== See also ==
- List of mantis genera and species
