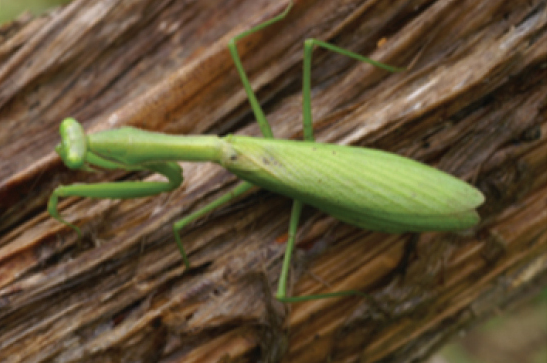
- Alalomantis muta

Scientific classification
- Kingdom: Animalia
- Phylum: Arthropoda
- Clade: Pancrustacea
- Class: Insecta
- Order: Mantodea
- Family: Mantidae
- Subtribe: Paramantina
- Genus: Alalomantis; Giglio-Tos, 1917

Species
- Alalomantis coxalis; Alalomantis muta

= Alalomantis =

Genus of praying mantises

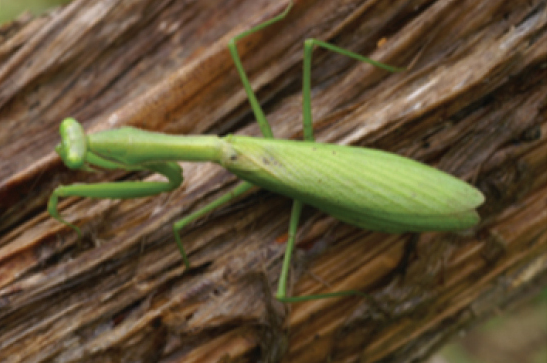
Alalomantis Mantidae from central African Republic.jpg

Alalomantis is a genus of praying mantis in the family Mantidae. It is recorded in west and central Africa.

== Species ==
The genus Alalomantis contains 2 valid species.

- Alalomantis coxalis Saussure & Zehntner, 1895
- Alalomantis muta Wood-Mason, 1889 (Cameroon Mantis)

== See also ==
- List of mantis genera and species
