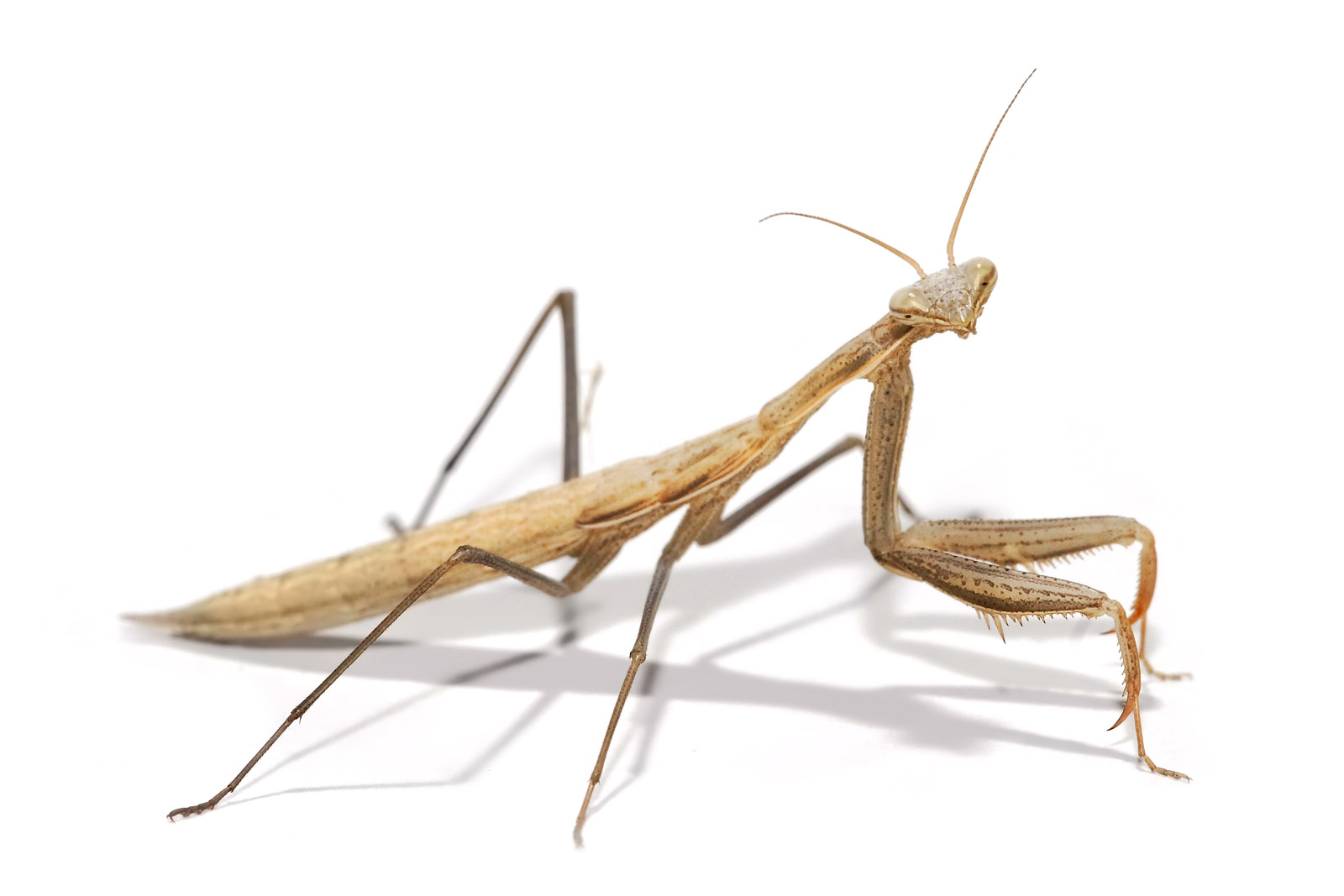
- Eight-spot mantis, Mantis octospilota

Scientific classification
- Kingdom: Animalia
- Phylum: Arthropoda
- Clade: Pancrustacea
- Class: Insecta
- Order: Mantodea
- Superfamily: Mantoidea
- Family: Mantidae; Burmeister, 1838

Subfamilies
- See text

= Mantidae =

Family of praying mantises

Mantidae is one of the largest families in the order of praying mantises, based on the type species Mantis religiosa; most genera are tropical or subtropical. Historically, this was the only family in the order, and many references still use the term "mantid" to refer to any mantis. Technically, however, "mantid" refers only to members of the family Mantidae, and not the numerous remaining families of mantises. Some of the most recent classifications have promoted a number of the mantid subfamilies to the rank of family, e.g. Iridopterygidae, Sibyllidae, Tarachodidae, Thespidae, and Toxoderidae, while other classifications have reduced the number of subfamilies without elevating them to higher rank.

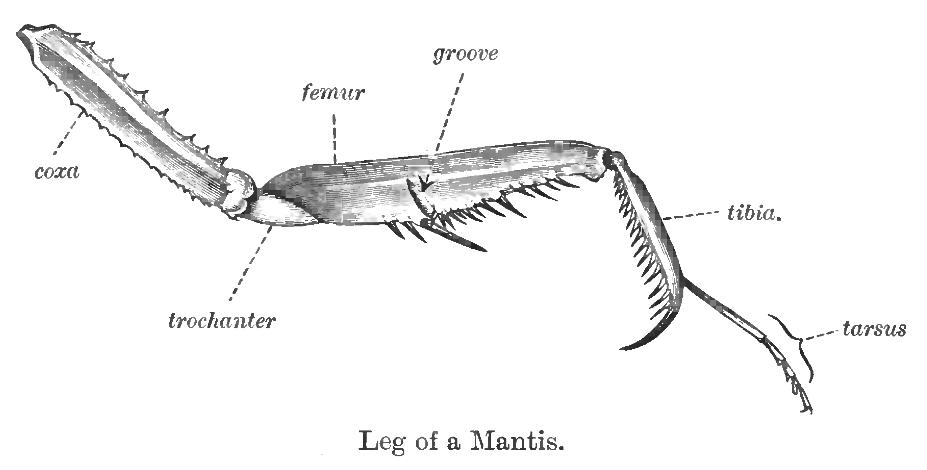
Details of a mantis modified foreleg

== Subfamilies and genera ==
Following the major revision of the Mantodea in 2019, the Mantodea Species File includes ten subfamilies:

=== Choeradodinae ===
The Americas, Asia

- Asiadodis Roy, 2004
- Choeradodis Serville, 1831

=== Deromantinae ===
Africa

- Deromantis Giglio-Tos, 1916
- Pseudostagmatoptera Beier, 1931

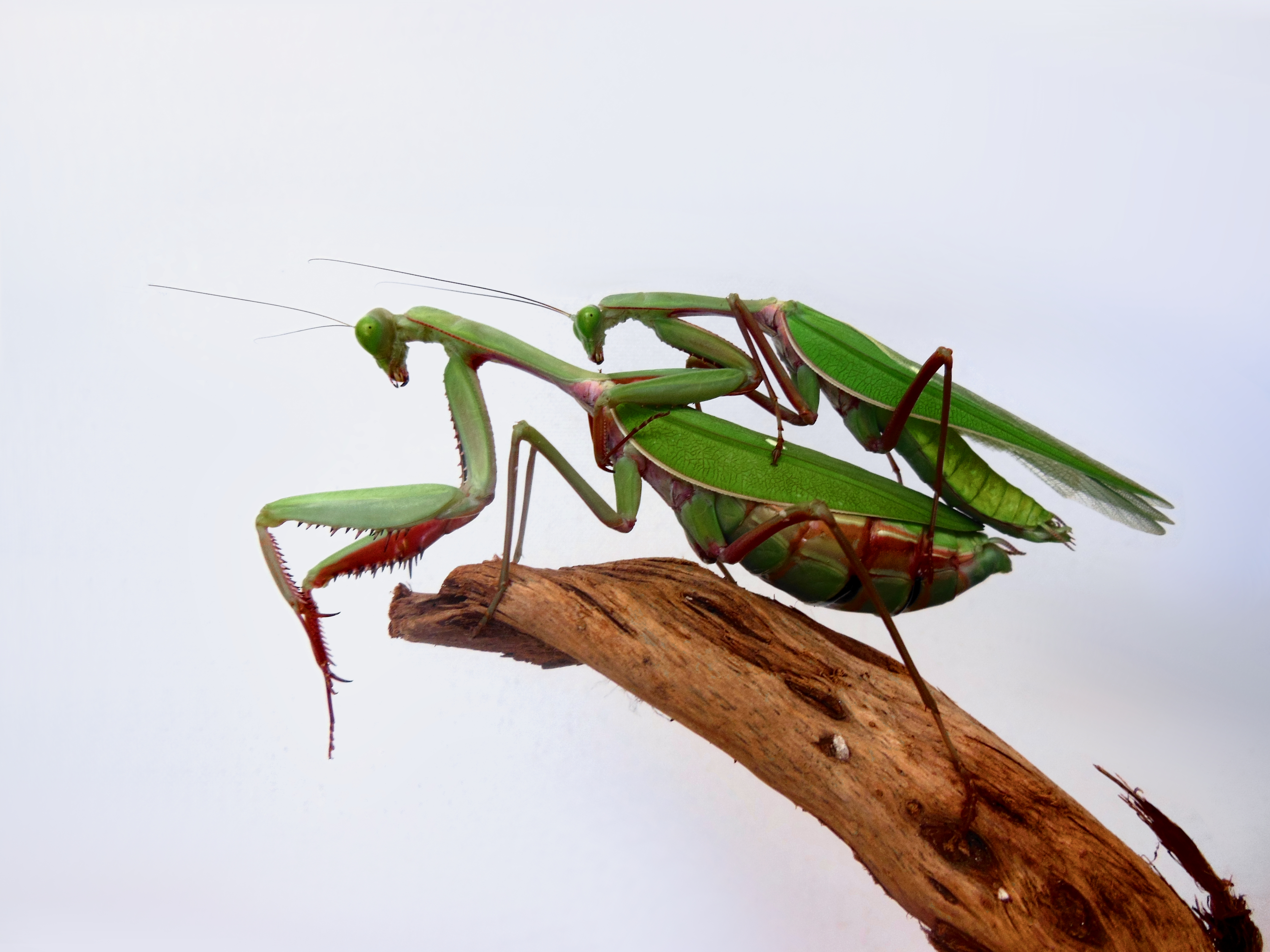
Hierodula majuscula, just before mating

=== Hierodulinae ===
Africa, Asia, Australia

- Archimantis Saussure, 1869
- Austromantis Sjostedt, 1918
- Austrovates Sjostedt, 1918
- Camelomantis Giglio-Tos, 1917
- Chlorocalis Stiewe, Shcherbakov & Vermeersch, 2019
- Coenomantis Giglio-Tos, 1917
- Corthylomantis Milledge, 1997
- Dracomantis Shcherbakov & Vermeersch, 2020
- Ephierodula Giglio-Tos, 1912
- Gretella Werner, 1923
- Hierodula Burmeister, 1838
- Hierodulella Giglio-Tos, 1912
- Mekongomantis Schwarz, Ehrmann & Shcherbakov, 2018
- Nullabora Tindale, 1923
- Pnigomantis Giglio-Tos, 1917
- Pseudomantis Saussure, 1869
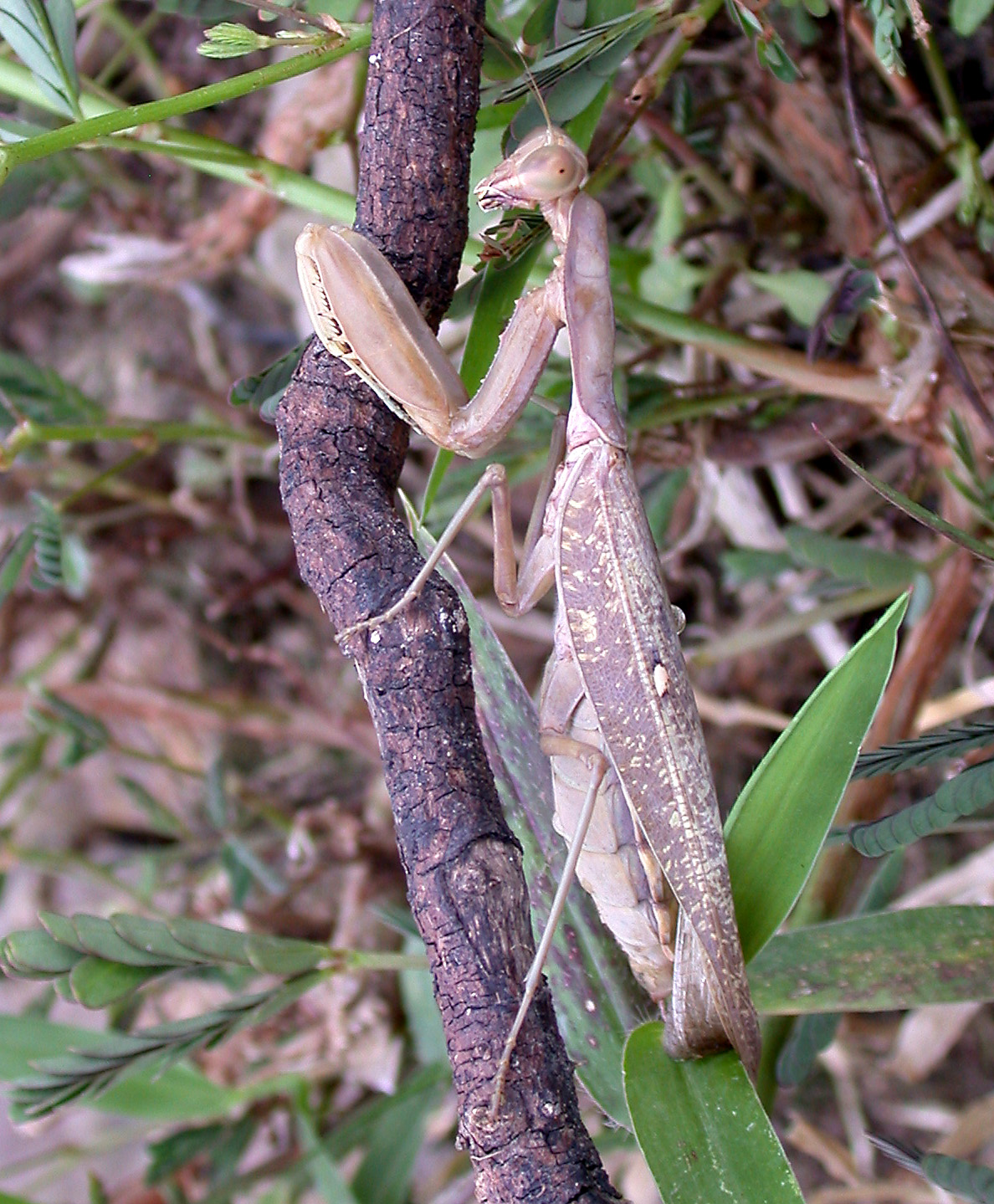
- Rhombomantis fusca in Thailand
  Rhombodera Burmeister, 1838
- Rhombomantis Ehrmann & Borer, 2015
- Sphodropoda Stal, 1871
- Stictomantis Beier, 1942
- Tamolanica Werner, 1923
- Tismomorpha Roy, 1973
- Titanodula Vermeersch, 2020
- Trachymantis Giglio-Tos, 1917
- Zopheromantis Tindale, 1924

=== Mantinae ===
Africa, Eurasia, North America

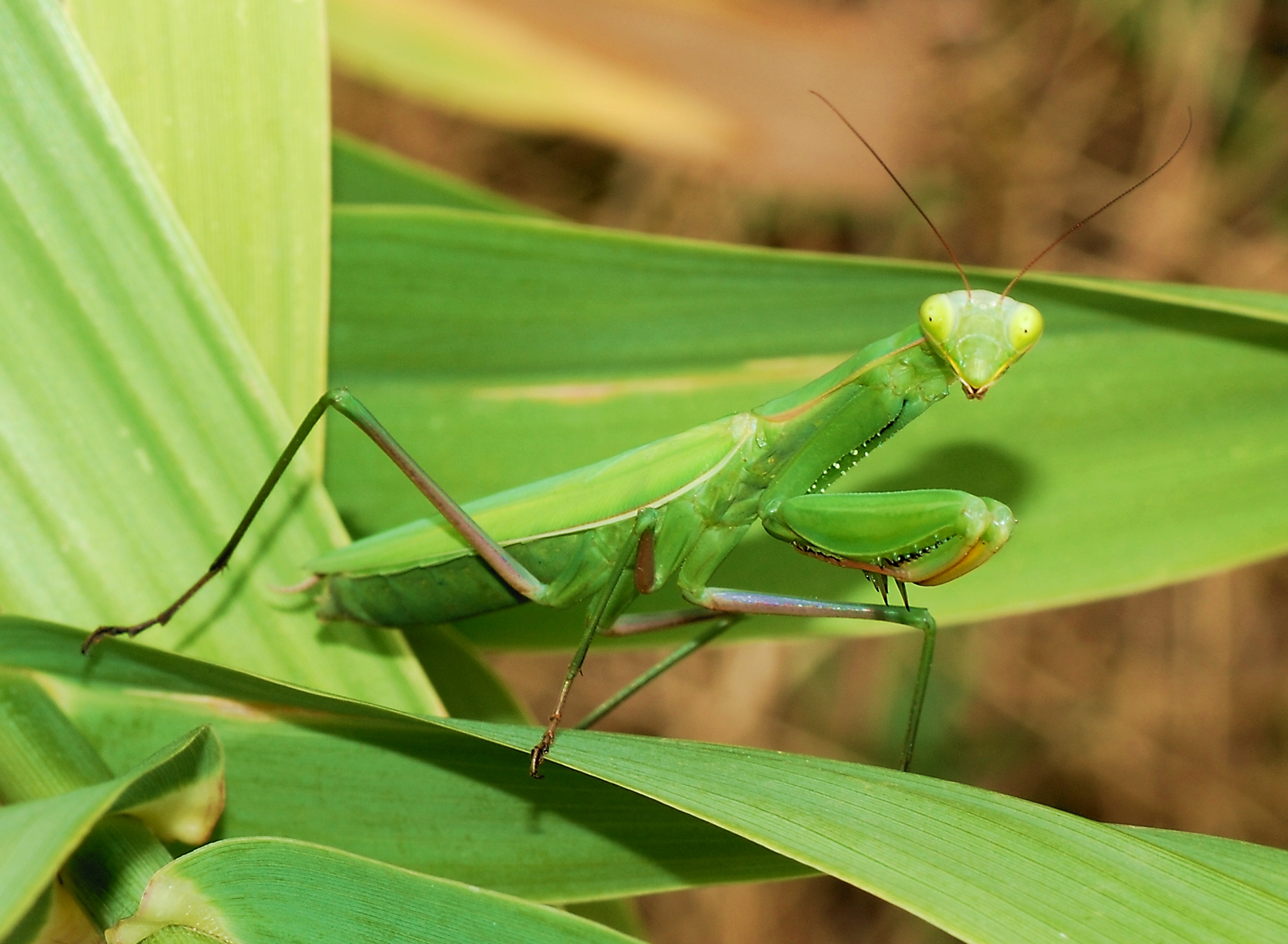
Adult female Mantis religiosa

- Mantilia Roy, 1993
- Mantis Linne, 1758
- Statilia Stal, 1877

=== Mellierinae ===
Australia

- Melliera Saussure, 1892
- Mellierella Giglio-Tos, 1915
- Rhodomantis Giglio-Tos, 1917
- Scolodera Milledge, 1989
- Xystropeltis Rehn, 1935

=== Omomantinae ===
- Omomantis Saussure, 1899

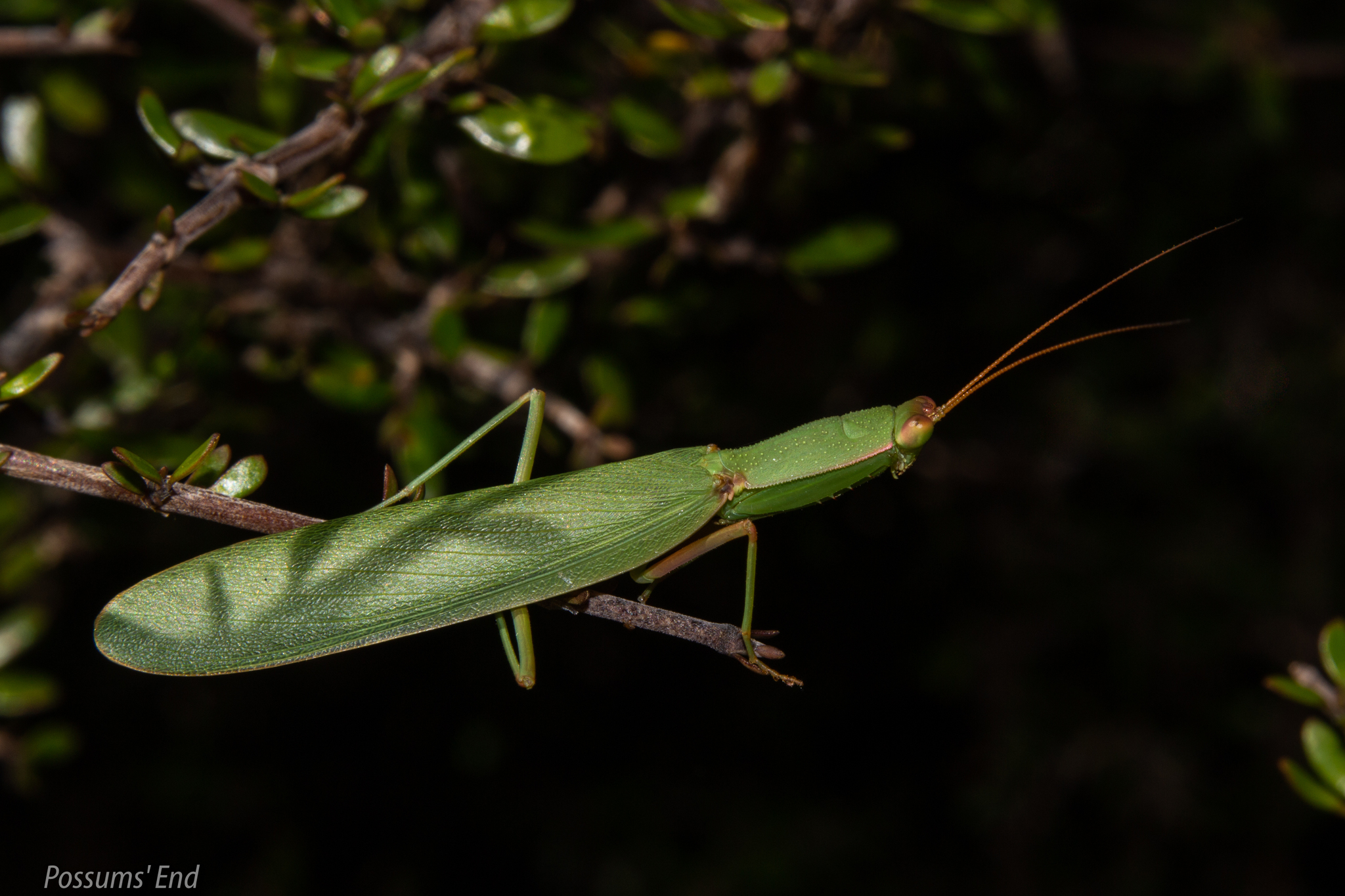
Orthodera novaezealandiae

=== Orthoderinae ===
- Orthodera Burmeister, 1838
- Orthoderina Sjostedt, 1918

=== Stagmomantinae ===
The Americas

- Antemna Stal, 1877
- Hondurantemna Rodrigues, Rivera, Reid & Svenson, 2017
- Phasmomantis Saussure, 1869
- Stagmomantis Saussure, 1869
- Tauromantis Giglio-Tos, 1917

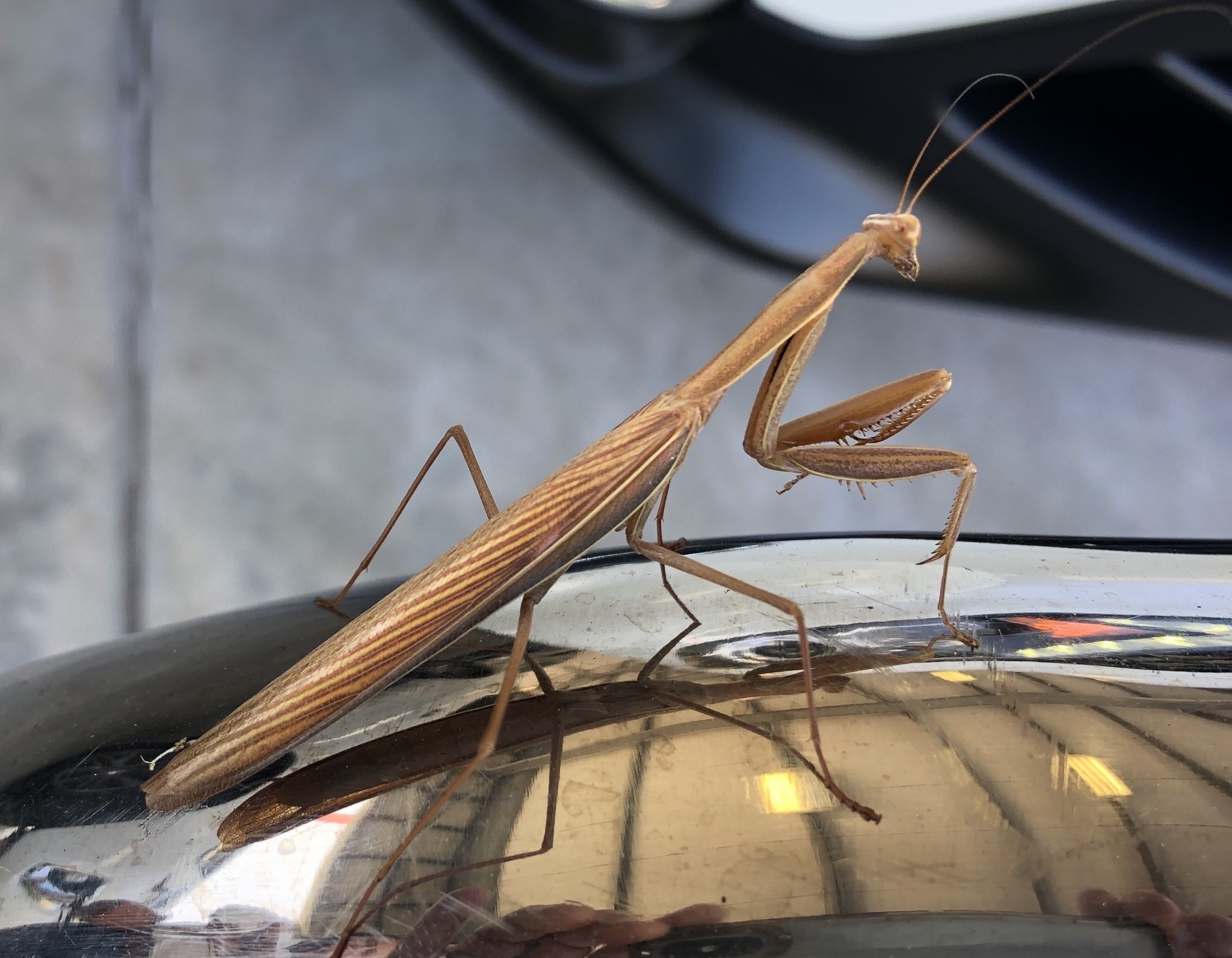
Paramantis sacra

=== Tenoderinae ===
Africa, Asia, North America

- Alalomantis Giglio-Tos, 1917
- Cataspilota Giglio-Tos, 1917
- Epitenodera Giglio-Tos, 1911
- Paramantis Ragge & Roy, 1967
- Mantasoa Mériguet, 2005
- Mesopteryx Saussure, 1870
- Nausicaamantis Meriguet, 2018
- Notomantis Tindale, 1923
- Plistospilota Giglio-Tos, 1911
- Polyspilota Burmeister, 1838
- Prohierodula Bolivar, 1908
- Rhomboderella Giglio-Tos, 1912
- Sphodromantis Stal, 1871
- Tarachomantis Brancsik, 1892
- Tenodera Burmeister, 1838
- Tenospilota Roy & Ehrmann, 2014
- Tisma Giglio-Tos, 1917

=== Vatinae ===
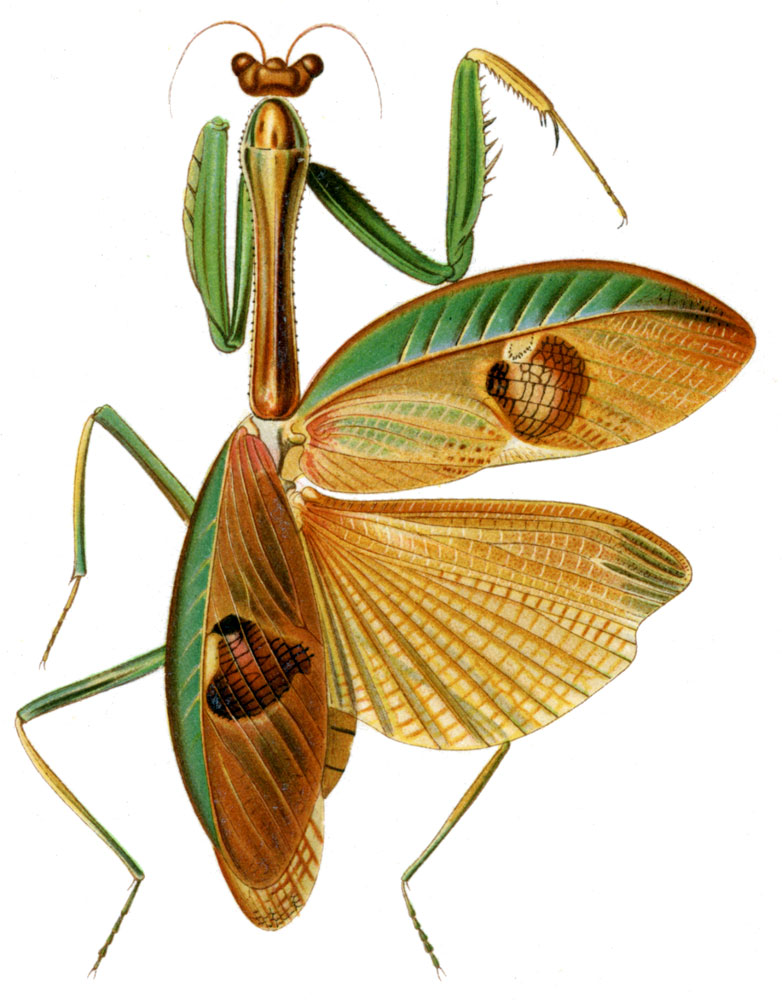
Stagmatoptera supplicaria

South America

- Alangularis Svenson, Medellin & Sarmiento, 2015
- Callivates Roy, 2003
- Catoxyopsis Giglio-Tos, 1914
- Chopardiella Giglio-Tos, 1914
- Heterovates Saussure, 1872
- Lobocneme Rehn, 1911
- Oxyopsis Caudell, 1904
- Parastagmatoptera Saussure, 1871
- Pseudovates Saussure, 1869
- Pseudoxyops Saussure & Zehntner, 1894
- Stagmatoptera Burmeister, 1838
- Vates Burmeister, 1838
- Zoolea Serville, 1839

== See also ==
- List of mantis genera and species
- Flower mantis
