= Stagmomantis conspurcata =

Scientific classification
- Kingdom: Animalia
- Phylum: Arthropoda
- Clade: Pancrustacea
- Class: Insecta
- Order: Mantodea
- Family: Mantidae
- Genus: Stagmomantis
- Species: S. conspurcata

Binomial name
- Stagmomantis conspurcata Serville, 1839

Species of mantis

Stagmomantis conspurcata is a species of mantis in the subfamily Stagmomantinae and in the genus Stagmomantis. It was, for a long time, synonymized with Stagmomantis carolina, but was revalidated in 2020. It is found in most of Texas, as well as other states near the Gulf of Mexico. Further north, it is replaced by Stagmomantis carolina.
