= Podagrion mantis =

Scientific classification
- Kingdom: Animalia
- Phylum: Arthropoda
- Clade: Pancrustacea
- Class: Insecta
- Order: Hymenoptera
- Family: Torymidae
- Genus: Podagrion
- Species: P. mantis

Binomial name
- Podagrion mantis Ashmead, 1886

Species of parasitoid wasp

Podagrion mantis was first described in 1886 by American entomologist W.H. Ashmead, representing the first species of its genus documented in the United States. All members of the genus Podagrion are parasitoid wasps that exclusively target mantid egg cases (oothecae). While most frequently associated with Stagmomantis carolina, they have also been recorded parasitizing oothecae of S. limbata and Tenodera angustipennis, demonstrating a high degree of host specificity.

The mantid ootheca is composed of tanning agents and structural proteins, forming a soft, tacky matrix when freshly deposited that rapidly hardens into a protective foam-like structure. Female Podagrion wasps can parasitize oothecae in both newly laid and fully hardened states. Using their elongated ovipositors, they deposit eggs deep within the egg case. Upon hatching, the parasitoid larvae consume developing mantid embryos, eventually emerging as adults from the ootheca.

The cumulative impact of parasitoid infestations across multiple generations has been estimated to cause over 30% mortality in mantid populations. Studies indicate a significant negative correlation between parasitoid infestation rates and successful mantid emergence from oothecae.

== Morphology ==
Members of the genus Podagrion are small parasitoid wasps, measuring 2–3 mm in length. Females possess an elongated ovipositor that may extend nearly as long as the body itself. The most distinctive morphological feature is the enlarged, claw-like femur on the hind legs. Paired with the tibia, this structure closely mimics the raptorial forelegs of their mantis hosts. Additional diagnostic traits include:

- A dorsoventrally flattened thorax (nearly equal in height and length)
- Clubbed antennae
- In females, a needle-like ovipositor surrounded by protective valvulae

=== Distribution ===
The genus Podagrion is believed to have a near-cosmopolitan distribution, though most documented species occur in the Afrotropical, Neotropical, and Australasian regions. P. mantis specifically ranges throughout the Americas.

=== Coloration ===
Adults exhibit a predominantly metallic green exoskeleton with muted yellow markings on the antennae and distal leg segments. A 1975 study by Grissell and Goodpasture noted minimal morphological variation among North American specimens, with color being the primary distinguishing trait:

- Northern populations typically display dark green coloration.
- Southeastern U.S. specimens often appear bronze-toned with yellow hind femora.

== Evolution and taxonomy ==
The parasitoid wasp Podagrion belongs to the superfamily Chalcidoidea, one of the most diverse insect groups. While approximately 23,000 chalcidoid species have been formally described, estimates suggest the true diversity may approach 500,000 species.

Taxonomic classification within the family Torymidae has undergone multiple revisions. A 2018 phylogenetic study by Janšta et al. analyzed nuclear coding genes (EF-1α, Wg), ribosomal genes (18S, 28S), and mitochondrial COI to clarify the origins, dispersal patterns, and relationships within the group. Results strongly support Podagrion as a monophyletic genus originating in the Palearctic region, with ancestral specialization on mantid (Mantodea) eggs. This evolutionary trajectory aligns with conserved morphological adaptations across the genus, including:

- A long, specialized ovipositor
- A micropilose region on the antennal clava (a sensilla-rich structure)

The clava's micropilose area enhances tactile assessment of oviposition sites; females rhythmically tap oothecae to evaluate host suitability. Podagrion shares closest phylogenetic affinity with the tribes Podagrionini and Mantiphagia though diagnostic morphological distinctions persist.

== Sexual behavior and reproduction ==
=== Mating behavior ===
Males of Podagrion species emerge 1–5 days before females and exhibit territorial behavior at mantid oothecae. Dominant males aggressively defend oviposition sites using their enlarged hind legs to dislodge rivals. If no females or competitors appear, males eventually abandon the site.

During courtship, males:

1. Palpate the ootheca with antennae, drumming perpendicularly to detect emerging females.
2. Stimulate quiescent females by rhythmically tapping their heads and tunnel edges.
3. Perform wing-fanning displays, lifting the abdomen to produce audible vibrations.

Females often remain motionless in emergence tunnels until male stimulation triggers exit. Upon emergence, males:

- Orient behind females, maintaining antennal contact with their heads.
- Mount while performing repetitive "scissor motions" with antennae over female eyes.
- Initiate copulation after dismounting, with females adopting a receptive posture.

Males may abbreviate courtship rituals when sequentially mating with multiple females.

=== Reproductive strategies ===
Podagrion exhibits frequent sib-mating due to limited dispersal capabilities. Regular inbreeding appears non-deleterious, likely due to:

- Low genetic recombination rates
- Reduced diploid chromosome numbers (maximum observed in the genus: 2n=10)

Like many Hymenoptera, reproduction follows haplodiploidy:

- Unfertilized eggs develop into haploid males
- Fertilized eggs yield diploid females

=== Oviposition behavior ===
Females parasitize oothecae through:

- Mechanical penetration: Sawing hardened cases with serrated ovipositors.
- Phoresy: Riding female mantids to oviposit on fresh oothecae before hardening.
- Recurrent parasitism: Reusing their natal ootheca for egg deposition.

=== Life cycle ===
Podagrion demonstrates multivoltine reproduction (≥3 generations/year, 35-day lifecycle) compared to their univoltine mantid hosts. Key adaptations include:

- Overwintering: Dormant larvae synchronize emergence with spring mantid hatching. There may also be an overwintering generation, that remains dormant with the mantis eggs for a longer period of time, emerging before they do.
- Oversummering: Final-generation larvae delay development in empty oothecae until fall host oviposition.
- Asynchronous parasitism: Multiple developmental stages coexist within a single ootheca due to staggered oviposition.

== Development ==
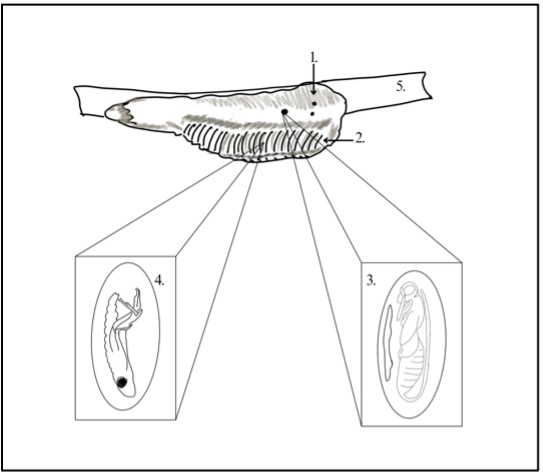
S. carolina ootheca 1. chewed emergence holes of P. mantis, 2. intact intended location of mantis emergence, 3. wasp larva in egg cell with empty egg membrane, 4. mantis larva, 5. oothecal substrate

The embryonic development of Podagrion remains poorly characterized, but likely follows general hymenopteran patterns with adaptations for ectoparasitism. Key features include:

- Centrolecithal, anhydropic eggs exhibiting superficial cleavage (plesiomorphic for Hymenoptera)
- Protostomic development, typical of arthropods

=== Oviposition and orientation ===
Females deposit eggs externally on individual mantid embryos within oothecal cells. Developing larvae consume host embryos completely, leaving only empty egg membranes.

Notably, Podagrion larvae orient opposite to their mantid hosts:

- Mantids hatch facing downward, using gravity to exit the ootheca.
- Parasitoid larvae develop with anterior ends oriented toward the ootheca's attachment surface.

=== Emergence patterns ===
Adult emergence exhibits two key constraints:

1. Numerical parity: Each wasp consumes one mantid embryo, limiting adult numbers to ≤ original host count.
2. Shared emergence holes: Wasps reuse existing exit pathways, complicating parasitoid census efforts.

Reported emergence ranges from <10 to >100 adults per ootheca, influenced by:

- Oothecal size and host density
- Frequency of multiparasitism (multiple females ovipositing)
