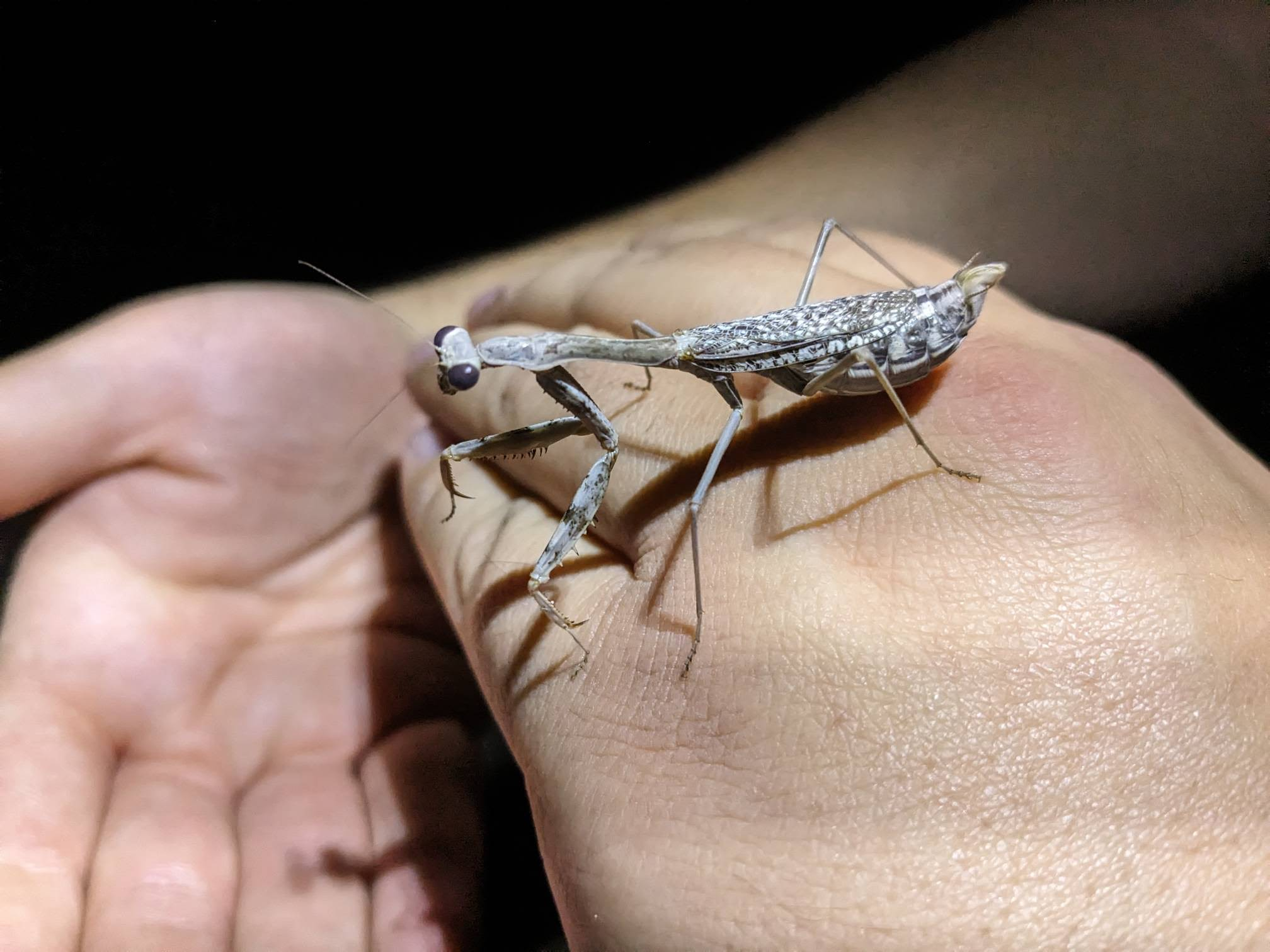
- Adult female
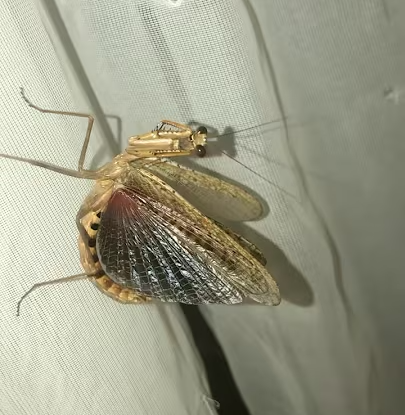
- Adult male

Scientific classification
- Kingdom: Animalia
- Phylum: Arthropoda
- Clade: Pancrustacea
- Class: Insecta
- Order: Mantodea
- Family: Mantidae
- Genus: Stagmomantis
- Species: S. wheelerii

Binomial name
- Stagmomantis wheelerii Thomas, 1875

Synonyms
- Stagmomantis californica (Rehn & Hebard, 1909)

= Stagmomantis wheelerii =

California mantis

Species of praying mantis

Stagmomantis wheelerii, common name California mantis, is a species of praying mantis in the family Mantidae that is native to the western United States. It was formerly known as Stagmomantis californica, but this name is a junior synonym and is not valid.

== Description ==
Adults of this species range in size from 2 to 3 inches in body length. There are green, yellow, and brown varieties, with subadults and adults tending to have dark transverse bands on the top of the abdomen. The wings of both sexes are mottled or suffused with dark brown or black and the hindwings are reddish. In most other physical respects they closely resemble one other member in California, the larger and more common Stagmomantis limbata. The oothecae and hatchlings are different from those of S. limbata. Hatchings of S. wheelerii mimic ants and are entirely black, whereas the hatchlings from S. limbata range from beige to green.

== Habitat ==
Within California, this common insect occurs throughout the warmer and drier regions of the southern part of the state below elevations of 10,000 feet. They prefer chaparral and desert environments with sufficient vegetation (the creosote bush is a favorite) in which they can climb, hide, and hunt. Their range extends from all of Southern California and eastward into Arizona, Nevada, Colorado, and Baja California. In the late 1980s, they began showing up in southern Idaho, and appear to be migrating northward, adapting to the colder winters along the way.

== Behavior and ecology ==
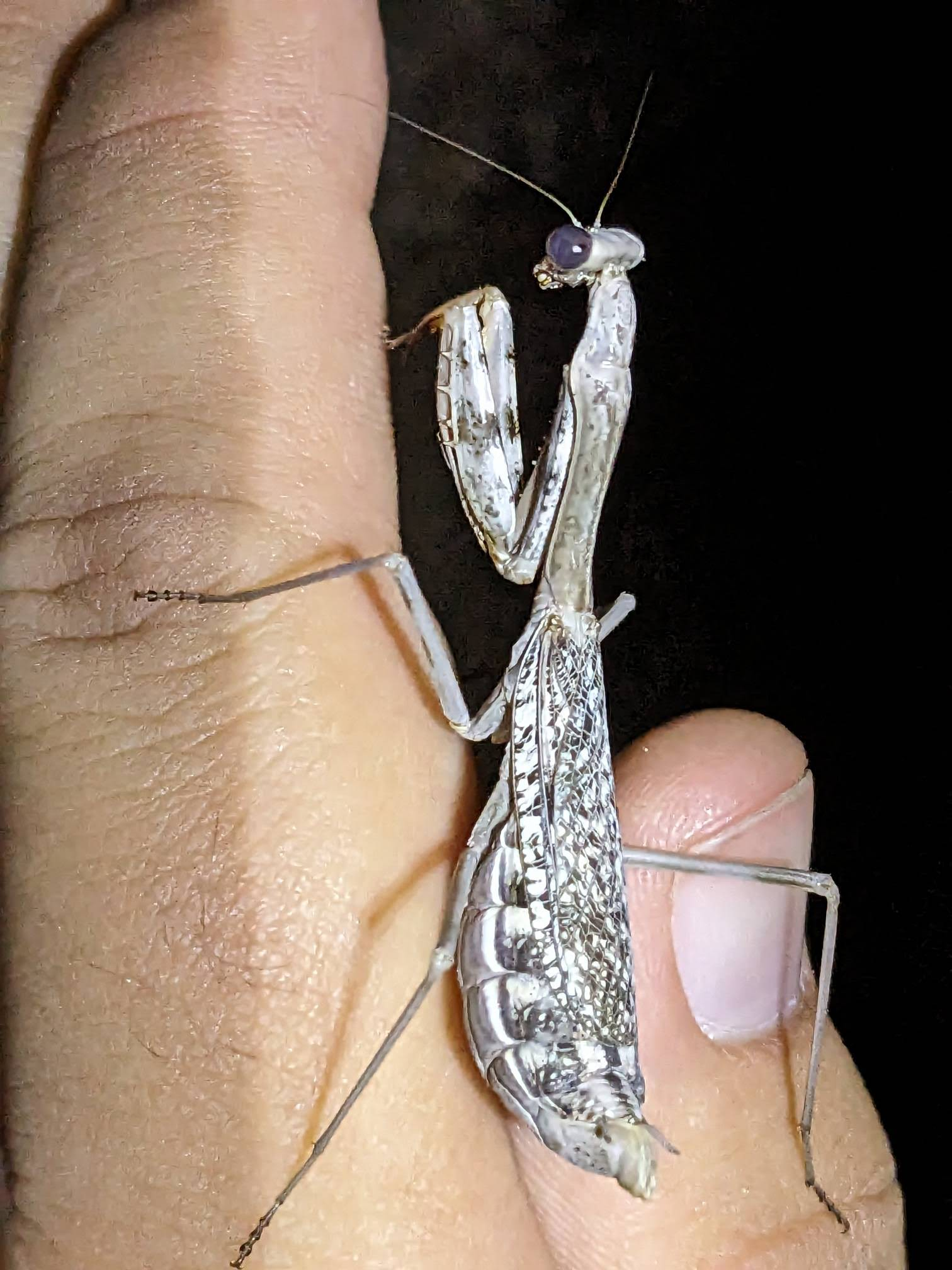
California mantis female (Stagmomantis wheelerii "californica")

Like all mantids, the California mantis is carnivorous, consuming virtually any other insect it perceives as small enough to be eaten, including other members of its own species. Males and females come together to reproduce but otherwise the adults are strictly solitary. Nymphs hatch in the spring from hard egg cases laid the previous fall. Adults do not overwinter—lifespan is seldom more than one year and usually less than nine months, with females sometimes surviving longer into the winter season than males, presumably allowing the females more time to lay their oothecas on suitable vegetation or rocks before dying. Though fast runners, both sexes have wings and are capable of flight (though this form of movement is energy intensive and seldom utilized). Males are especially good flyers: the wings of the male extend well beyond the end of the abdomen, whereas those of the female do not extend more than half this distance. Males are often attracted to bright lights at night and can sometimes be found swarming around them along with other insects, though as ambush hunters, they fly at night primarily for dispersal and not in search of food—those swarming around lights are disoriented, behaving as though the light is actually the moon and attempting to fly in a straight line.

When Stagmomantis wheelerii mate, the mount can last for hours. Often during or after mating the female S. wheelerii devours the male, allowing the female to have enough protein to create an ootheca. All S. wheelerii have sensors near their legs that allow the praying mantis to lose its head and still function.

== See also ==
- List of mantis genera and species
- Sonoran Tiger Mantis
- Stagmomantis
- Mantidae
- Stagmomantis limbata
