= Stagmomantis coerulans =

Scientific classification
- Kingdom: Animalia
- Phylum: Arthropoda
- Class: Insecta
- Order: Mantodea
- Family: Mantidae
- Genus: Stagmomantis
- Species: S. coerulans

Binomial name
- Stagmomantis coerulans Saussure & Zehntner, 1894

Species of mantis

Stagmomantis coerulans is a species of mantis in the order Mantodea that was described by Henri Saussure and Leo Zehntner in 1894.
