= Lumina Cotton Riddle Smyth =

Botanist (1863-1926)

Lumina Cotton Riddle (1871–1939) was an American botanist. She was a direct descendant of John Cotton.

== Early life and education ==
Born 18 March 1871, one of several children of Ida (nee Carlton) and George Riddle. Studied at Ohio State University where she received her BS in 1897, MS in 1898 and her doctorate in botany in 1905 - the first botany doctorate and the second doctorate of any kind awarded by the institution. She was taught by William Ashbrook Kellerman.

== Life ==
Riddle taught at the Akeley Institute, Michigan, from 1899 to 1900. In 1901 she was curator of natural history at Washburn College in Topeka. She then worked as a high school teacher at Altoona, Kansas, 1901–02, returning to Washburn College as curator from 1903 to 1904 and as Acting professor of zoology and physiology.

In 1906 Riddle married Bernard Bryan Smyth, curator of both the herbarium and ornithological collections at Kansas State Museum. The couple worked together on researching flora in Kansas.

Also in 1906 she joined the staff of Kansas State Museum, Topeka, becoming a curator in 1913 and staying there until 1915. In 1917 she once again took the role of curator at Washburn College.

She returned to high school teaching at Munden, Kansas between 1917 and 1918, before becoming a school superintendent until 1920. She then worked at Ottawa University as an assistant biology professor from 1921 to 1924.

Riddle was a member of the Agassiz Association, the AAAS, the Britton and Brown Botanical Club and both the Kansas and Ohio Academies of Science.

Riddle died in Cleveland, Ohio on 2 February 1939

== Works ==
- (with Bernard B. Smyth) (1911). "Catalogue of the Flora of Kansas, Part I". Trans. Kans. Acad. Sci. 23/4(?): 273–95.
- "The Embryology of Alyssum". Botanical Gazette. 27: 314–323. 1899.
- "Development of the Embryo Sac and Embryo of Staphylea trifolia". Ohio Naturalist. 5: 353–363. 1905.
- Occurrence of Podagrion Mantis in the Eggs of the Common Mantis. Trans. of the Kansas Academy of Sci. (1903-) 21: 178-179
