= Stagmomantis resacae =

Scientific classification
- Kingdom: Animalia
- Phylum: Arthropoda
- Clade: Pancrustacea
- Class: Insecta
- Order: Mantodea
- Family: Mantidae
- Genus: Stagmomantis
- Species: S. resacae

Binomial name
- Stagmomantis resacae Anderson, 2021

Species of mantis

Stagmomantis resacae, the Resaca mantis, is a species of mantis in the order Mantodea that was described in 2021. It is native to South Texas and Mexico and was formerly known as a population of Stagmomantis carolina, before being split off from it and classified as a new species.

== See also ==
- Carolina Mantis
- List of mantis genera and species
- Stagmomantis
