= William Ashbrook Kellerman =

American botanist (1850–1908)

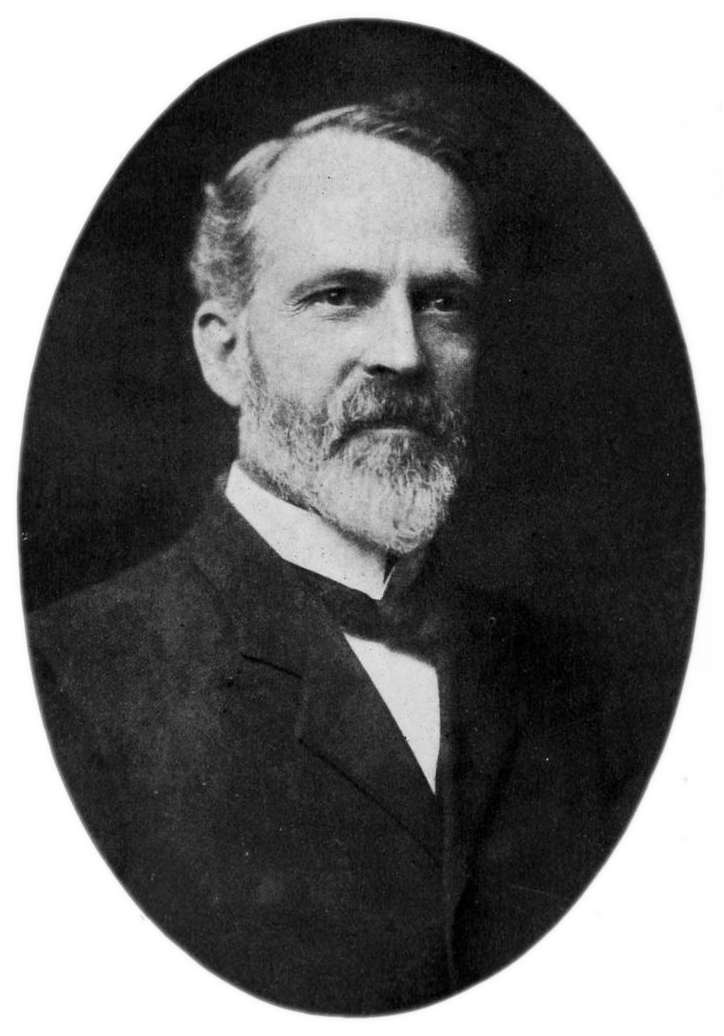
- Born: May 1, 1850; Ashville, Ohio, U.S.
- Died: March 8, 1908 (aged 57)
- Education: Cornell University (BS); University of Göttingen; University of Zurich (PhD)
- Occupations: Botanist; mycologist; photographer
- Spouse: Stella Victoria Dennis (m. 1876)
- Scientific career
- Fields: Botany, mycology

William Ashbrook Kellerman (May 1, 1850 Ashville, Ohio – March 8, 1908) was an American botanist, mycologist and photographer.

== Biography ==
Kellerman was born in May 1850 in Ohio, the son of Daniel Kemberling Kellerman and Iva/Ivy Ashbrook Kellerman. His father a merchant and Farmer originally from Pennsylvania did well for himself and put his son in fine schools. He received his Bachelor of Science degree from Cornell University in 1874. After graduation, Kellerman was hired as Professor of Natural Sciences at the Wisconsin State Normal School, a position he held for five years. During this time, in 1876, he married Stella Victoria Dennis, also a botanist.

In 1879, the Kellermans moved to Germany, where he attended the Universities of Göttingen and Zurich, where he obtained his Ph.D. in 1881. They returned to the U.S., and he was appointed Professor of Botany and Zoology at the State College (now University) of Kentucky in Lexington. In 1883, he joined the Department of Botany and Zoology at the Kansas State College of Agriculture (now Kansas State University) in Manhattan. He also became state botanist and wrote a pamphlet on the flora of Kansas. In 1891 he became a professor of botany at Ohio State University. One of his students was Lumina Cotton Riddle, the first woman to receive a doctorate in Botany from the university.

He studied the smuts (fungal diseases) of wheat and oats, and demonstrated that hot water is an effective fungicide. With Benjamin Matlack Everhart and Job Bicknell Ellis, in 1885 he founded the Journal of Mycology, now Mycologia. In 1904 he began making annual botanical expeditions to Guatemala. It was there in 1908 that he contracted a fever (generally believed to be malaria), died, and was buried in the "cactus fenced cemetery at Zacapa."

He edited three exsiccata works. The one with the title Ohio fungi is found in major herbaria. The same is with the series Kansas fungi which he issued with Walter Tennyson Swingle.

== Works ==
- Elements of Botany
- Plant Analysis
- Spring Flora of Ohio (1895)
- Catalogue of Ohio Plants, published by Ohio State, the fourth catalog it had issued (1899, a supplement was issued the following year)
- Non-Indigenous Flora of Ohio, prepared with the assistance of his wife (1900)
