= Arizona mantis =

Species of praying mantis

Arizona mantis is a common name applied to various species of praying mantis native to Arizona, particularly:

- Pseudovates arizonae, the Arizona unicorn mantis
- Stagmomantis gracilipes, the Arizona tan mantis
- Stagmomantis limbata, the Arizona mantis or bordered mantis

== See also ==
- List of mantis genera and species
