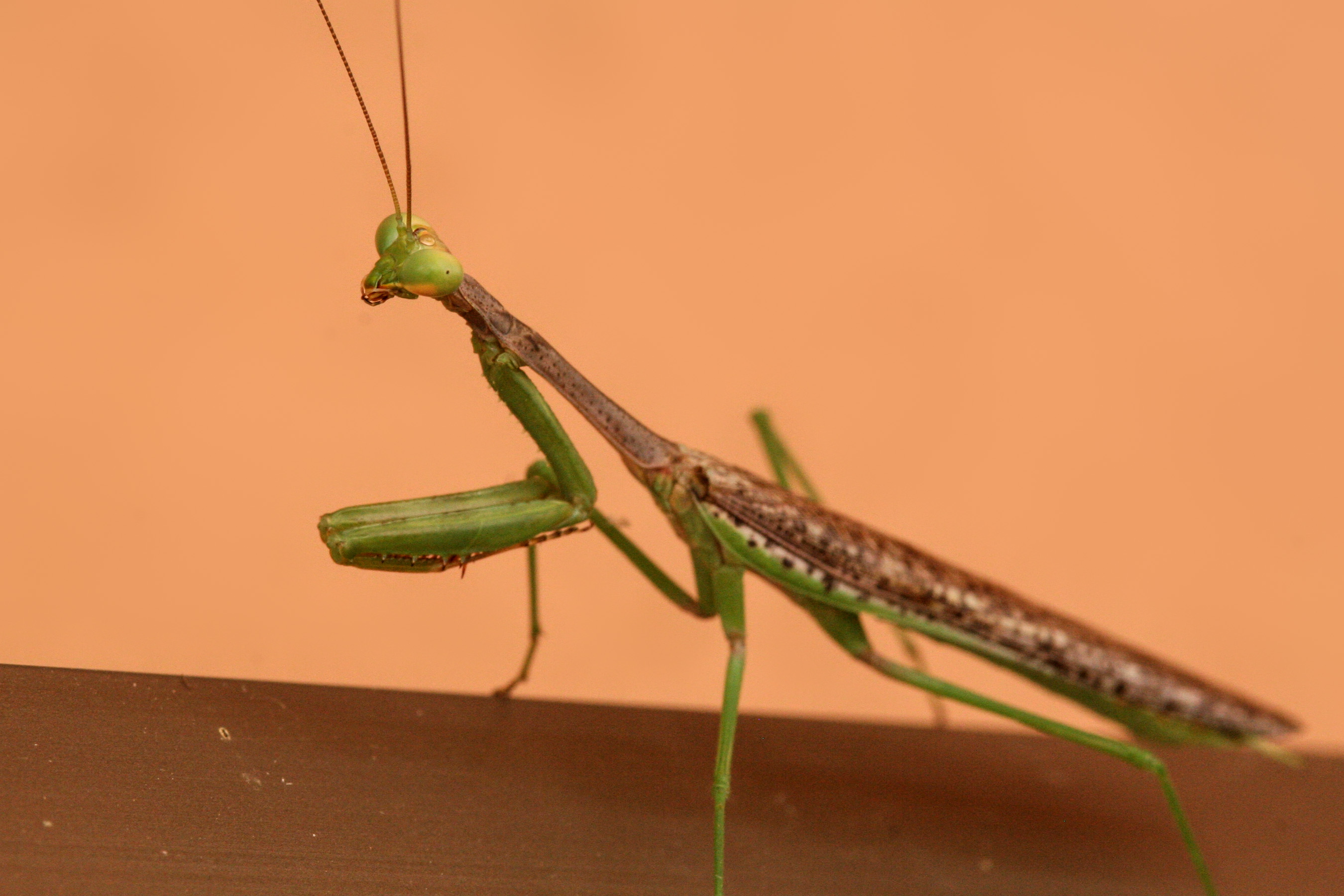
- Adult male

Scientific classification
- Kingdom: Animalia
- Phylum: Arthropoda
- Clade: Pancrustacea
- Class: Insecta
- Order: Mantodea
- Family: Mantidae
- Genus: Stagmomantis
- Species: S. clauseni

Binomial name
- Stagmomantis clauseni Garikipati, 2024

= Stagmomantis clauseni =

Sonoran Tiger Mantis

Species of insect

Stagmomantis clauseni, the Sonoran tiger mantis, is a species in the Stagmomantis genus, split off from Stagmomantis wheelerii. It was described in 2024 by Lohitashwa Garikipati from a specimen found in Ruby Road, Pima County, Arizona, United States.
