= Phasmomantis =

Scientific classification
- Kingdom: Animalia
- Phylum: Arthropoda
- Clade: Pancrustacea
- Class: Insecta
- Order: Mantodea
- Family: Mantidae
- Tribe: Stagmomantini
- Genus: Phasmomantis; Saussure, 1869

Genus of praying mantises

Phasmomantis is a genus of mantis of the family Mantidae.

== Species ==
There are two species recognized in the genus Phasmomantis:

- Phasmomantis basalis (Stal, 1877)
- Phasmomantis sumichrasti (Saussure, 1861) (Giant Mexican Mantis)

== See also ==
- List of mantis genera and species
