= Phasmomantis sumichrasti =

Scientific classification
- Kingdom: Animalia
- Phylum: Arthropoda
- Clade: Pancrustacea
- Class: Insecta
- Order: Mantodea
- Family: Mantidae
- Genus: Phasmomantis
- Species: P. sumichrasti

Binomial name
- Phasmomantis sumichrasti (Saussure, 1861)

Synonyms
- Phasmomantis mexicana (Saussure, 1861)

Species of praying mantis

Phasmomantis sumichrasti, the Giant Mexican Mantis, is a species of mantis of the family Mantidae.

== Range ==
It is found in Honduras, Mexico, and the United States (Texas),

== See also ==
- List of mantis genera and species
