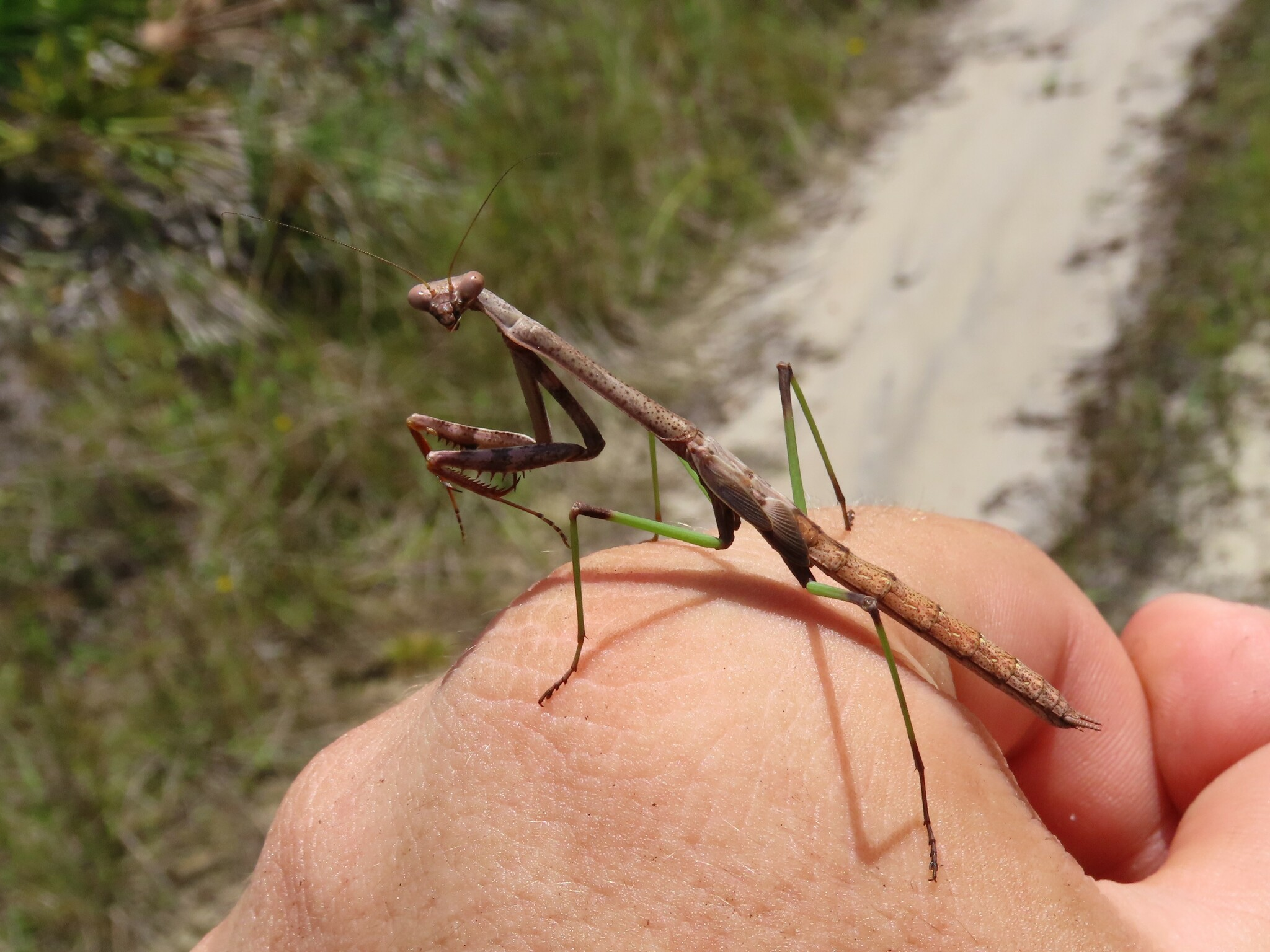

Scientific classification
- Kingdom: Animalia
- Phylum: Arthropoda
- Clade: Pancrustacea
- Class: Insecta
- Order: Mantodea
- Family: Mantidae
- Genus: Stagmomantis
- Species: S. floridensis

Binomial name
- Stagmomantis floridensis Davis, 1919

= Stagmomantis floridensis =

Species of praying mantis

Stagmomantis floridensis, common name larger Florida mantis, is a species of praying mantis in the family Mantidae. They are endemic to Florida.
