= Stagmomantis gracilipes =

Scientific classification
- Kingdom: Animalia
- Phylum: Arthropoda
- Clade: Pancrustacea
- Class: Insecta
- Order: Mantodea
- Family: Mantidae
- Genus: Stagmomantis
- Species: S. gracilipes

Binomial name
- Stagmomantis gracilipes Rehn, 1907

Species of praying mantis

Stagmomantis gracilipes, common name Arizona tan mantis, is a species of praying mantis in the family Mantidae. They are native to the south-western United States and Mexico. Distinguished from other Stagmomantis species by its slender legs (reflected in the specific epithet 'gracilipes,' meaning slender-footed). The common name 'Arizona tan mantis' suggests a tan or light brown coloration. Further distinguishing features from congeners such as Stagmomantis limbata (Arizona or bordered mantid) and Stagmomantis californica (California mantid) require detailed examination of morphological characters.

== See also ==
- Arizona mantis
- List of mantis genera and species
