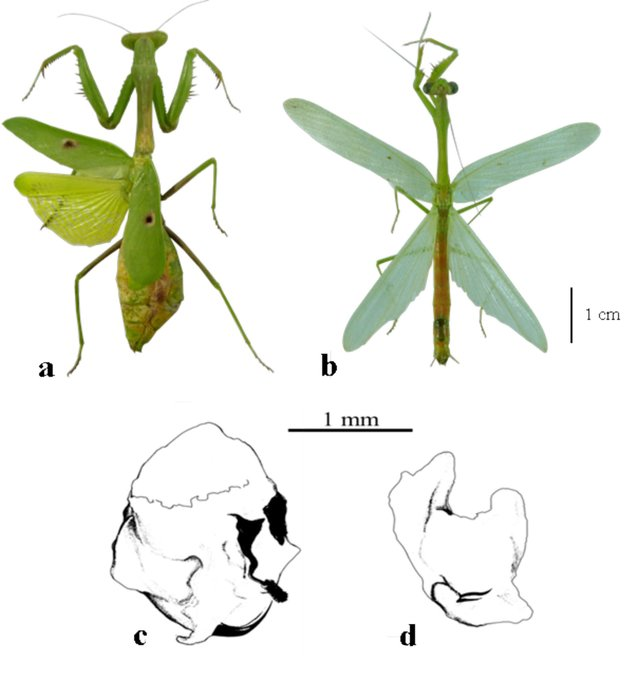
- stagmomantis.jpg

Scientific classification
- Domain: Eukaryota
- Kingdom: Animalia
- Phylum: Arthropoda
- Class: Insecta
- Order: Mantodea
- Family: Mantidae
- Genus: Stagmomantis
- Species: S. tolteca

Binomial name
- Stagmomantis tolteca (Saussure, 1861)

Synonyms
- Mantis tolteca Saussure, 1861; Stagmomantis carolina var. tolteca Saussure, 1871

= Stagmomantis tolteca =

Species of praying mantis

Stagmomantis tolteca is a species of praying mantis in the family Mantidae.

== See also ==
- List of mantis genera and species
