= Isomantis =

Scientific classification
- Kingdom: Animalia
- Phylum: Arthropoda
- Clade: Pancrustacea
- Class: Insecta
- Order: Mantodea
- Family: Mantidae
- Subfamily: Stagmomantinae
- Tribe: Stagmomantini
- Genus: Isomantis; Giglio-Tos, 1917

Genus of insects

Isomantis is a genus of mantis in the tribe Stagmomantini. It was formerly considered a synonym of Stagmomantis, but revalidated by Kris Anderson.

== Species ==
- Isomantis domingensis Palisot de Beauvois, 1805 — "Antillean Mantis", Dominican Republic
- Isomantis grandis Roy, 2021 — Puerto Rico
