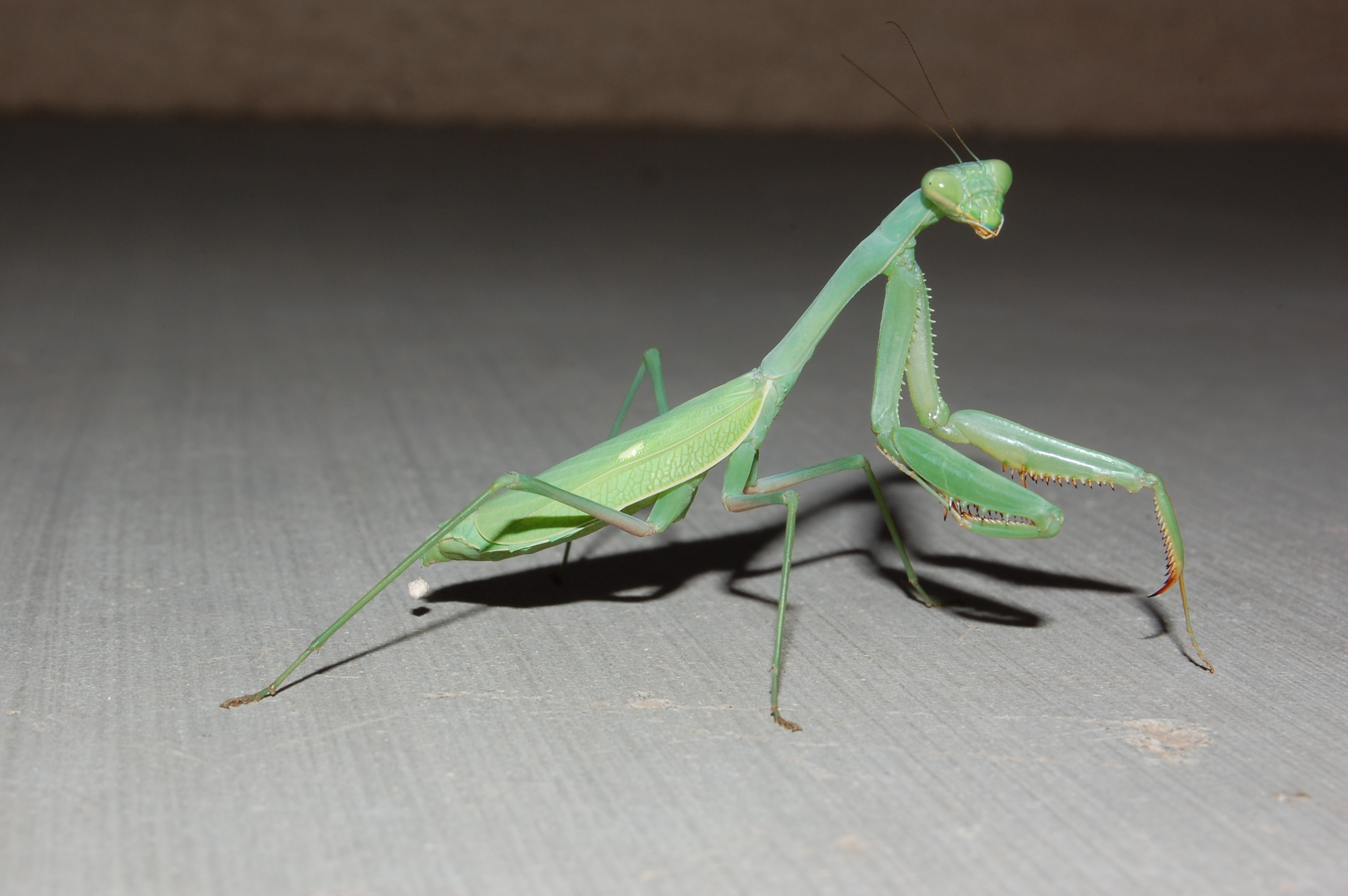
- Adult female
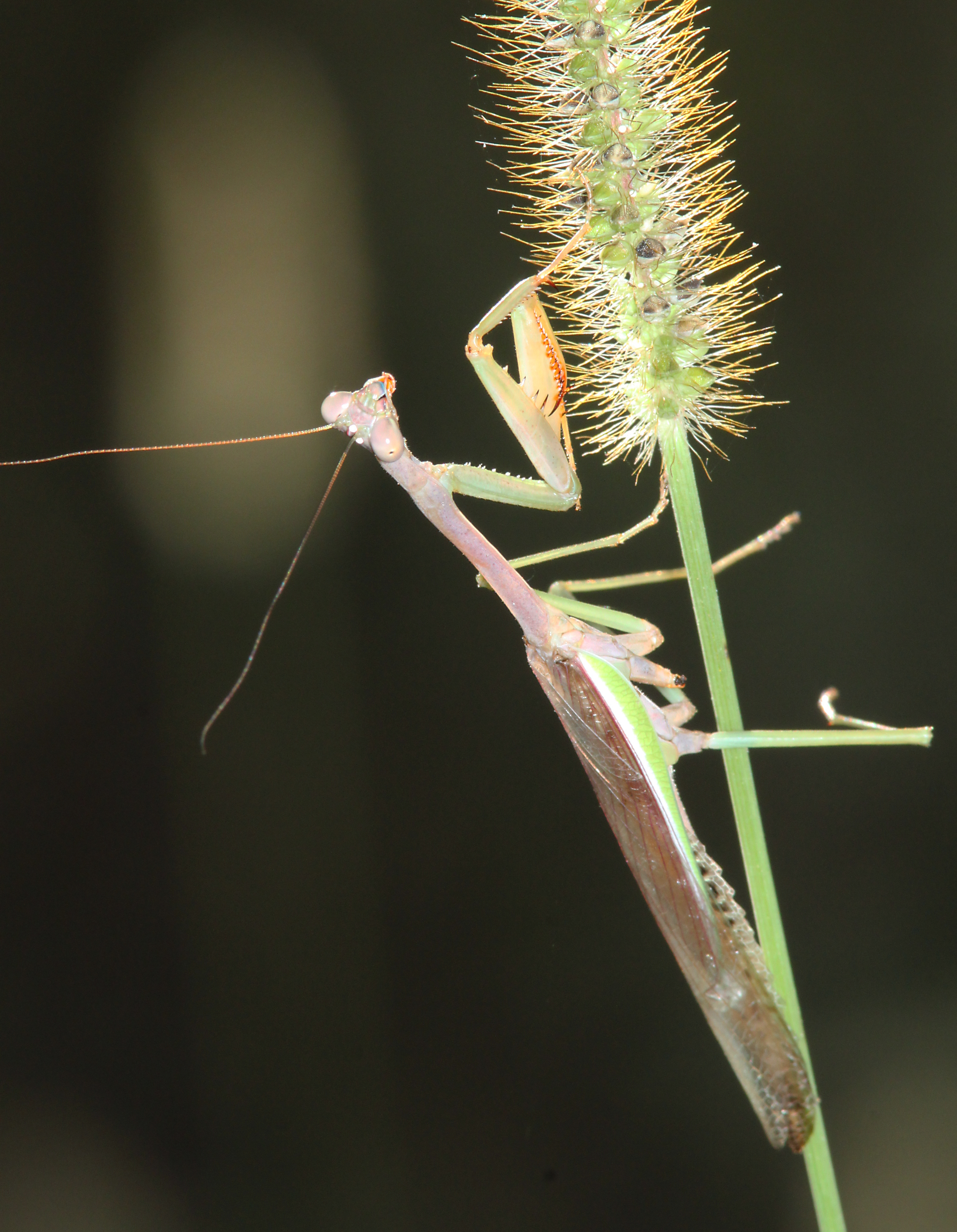
- Adult male

Scientific classification
- Kingdom: Animalia
- Phylum: Arthropoda
- Clade: Pancrustacea
- Class: Insecta
- Order: Mantodea
- Family: Mantidae
- Genus: Stagmomantis
- Species: S. limbata

Binomial name
- Stagmomantis limbata Hahn, 1835

Synonyms
- Stagmomantis asteca (Saussure, 1859); Stagmomantis cellularis (Burmeister, 1838); Stagmomantis viridimargo (Burmeister, 1838)

= Stagmomantis limbata =

Species of praying mantis

Stagmomantis limbata, common name bordered mantis, bosque mantis, Arizona mantis, or New Mexico praying mantis, is a species of praying mantis native to North America, most prevalent in the south-western United States. This beneficial insect is green or beige in color and grows up to around 3 inches long.

== Behavior ==
Stagmomantis limbata are attracted to lights, and males often fly to lights in numbers, but females are unable to fly.

== Description ==
S. limbata is one of the largest mantids native to North America, though it is much smaller than some African and Asian mantids such as species in the genera Sphodromantis and Hierodula. Females grow to 3 inches in body length, while males grow to about 2 inches. This makes them larger than other species in their genus, such as S. carolina. The facial plate (below and between antennae) is about twice as wide as it is long, typical of the genus, though the eyes are not as protruding as the Carolina Mantid's. Both males and females of this species are separated by nearly all others in Stagmomantis (except for S. montana) by their blue labrum.

Females are most often fairly plain green (often with a yellowish abdomen), but sometimes gray, or light brown, with dark spot in middle of the tegmina, which do not completely cover the wide abdomen. The tegmina are bordered with white, giving this species its common name Bordered Mantis. However, this border is often only seen in green individuals. Hindwings of females are checkered or striped yellow. Females differ from males by being larger and much more robust.

Males are slender, long-winged, and variable in color, but most often green and brown with a green stripe across the sides of the tegmina and the top brownish (may be solid gray, brown, green, or any combination of these). Abdomen without prominent dark spots on top. The wings are transparent, usually with cloudy brownish spots on outer half.

== Habitat ==
Variable, often in open semi-arid areas in tall forbs, shrubs, or trees, but more abundant in lusher, often riparian and wooded areas of streamsides, roadsides, canyons, in towns, etc.

== Range ==
S. limbata is the most common native mantis in western United States. Its range covers Texas to Southern California, north into Colorado and Utah, south into Mexico.

== Additional images ==
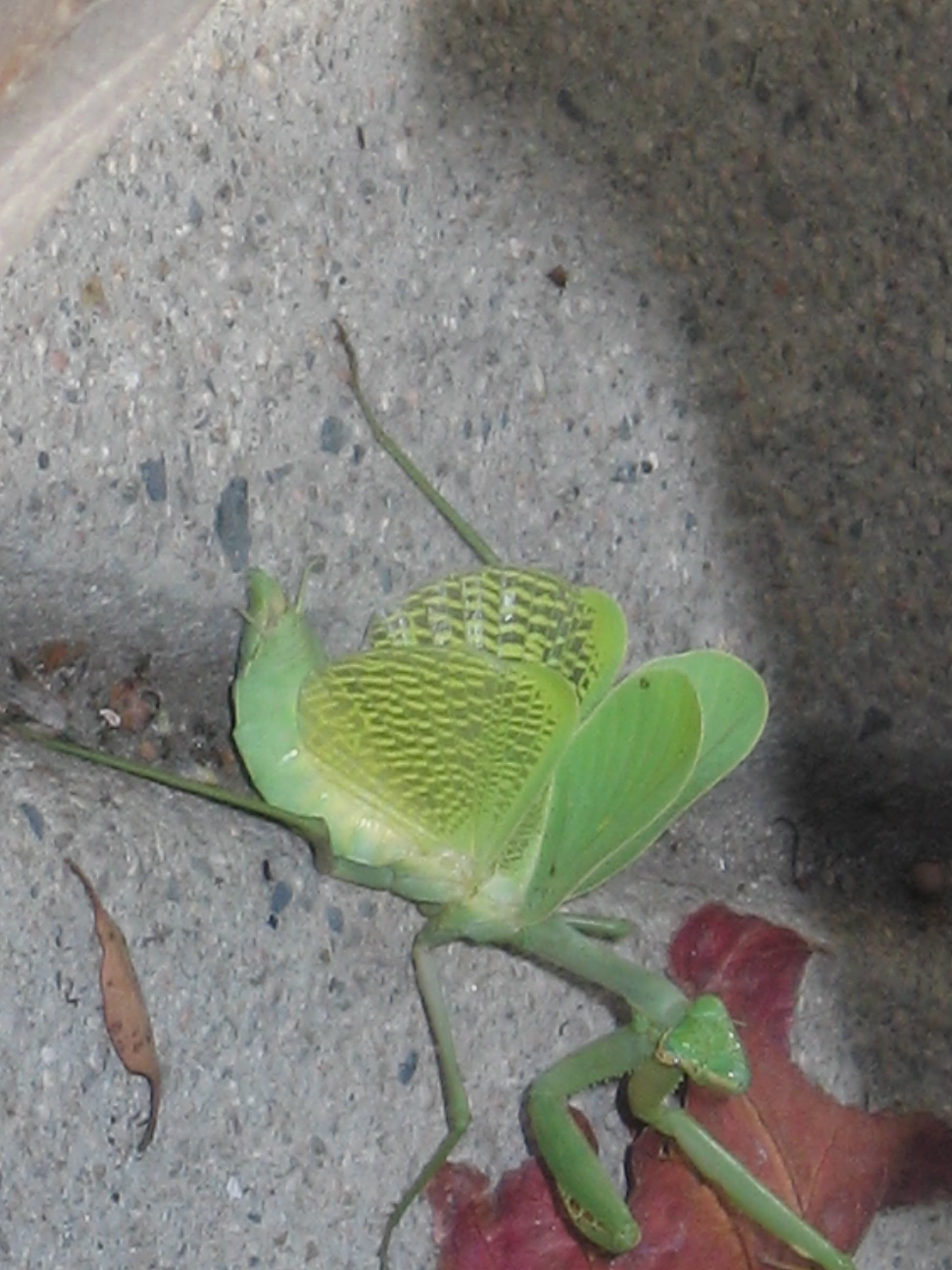
Adult female Stagmomantis limbata in defensive posture

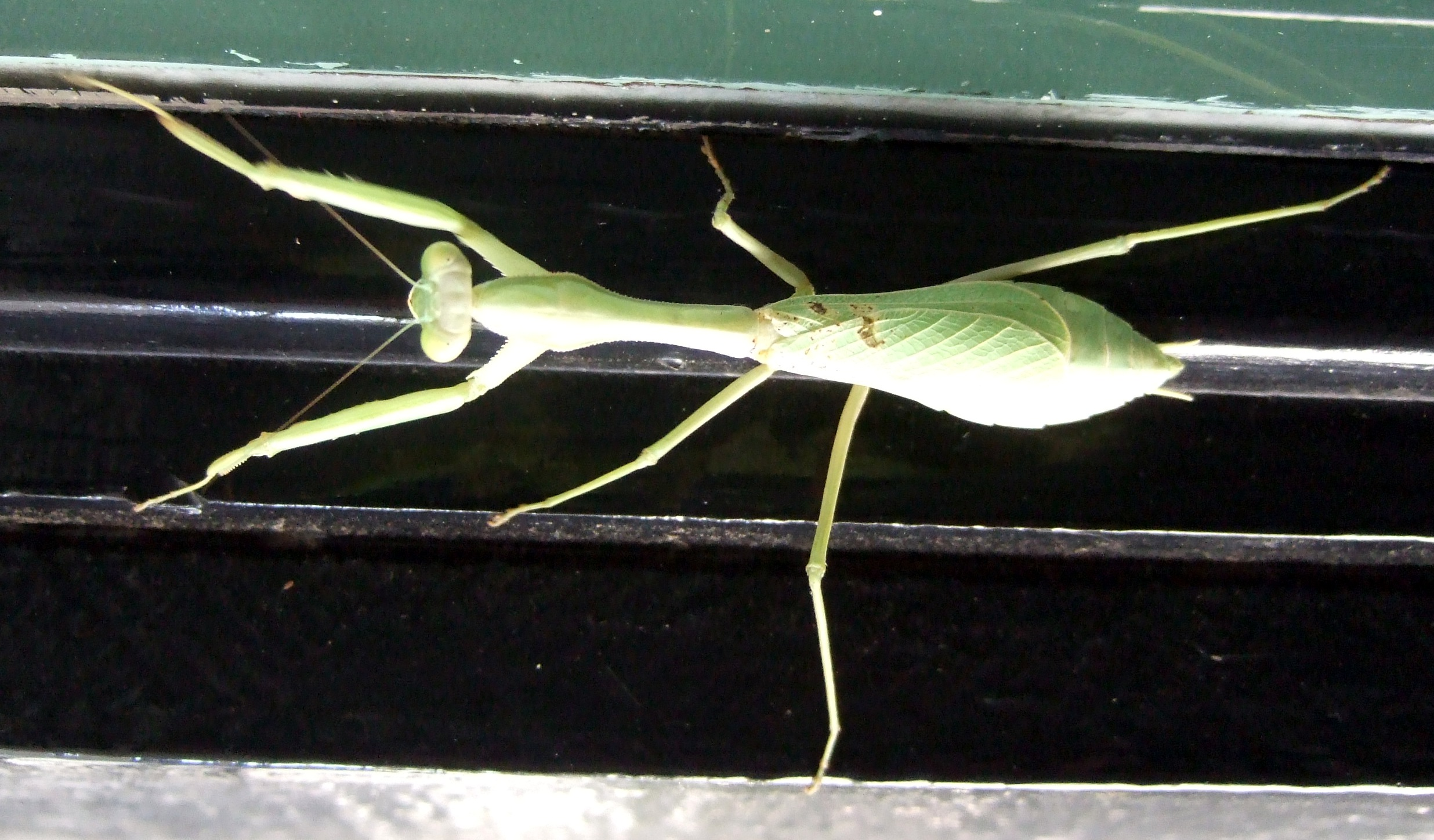
Adult female Stagmomantis limbata, dorsal view

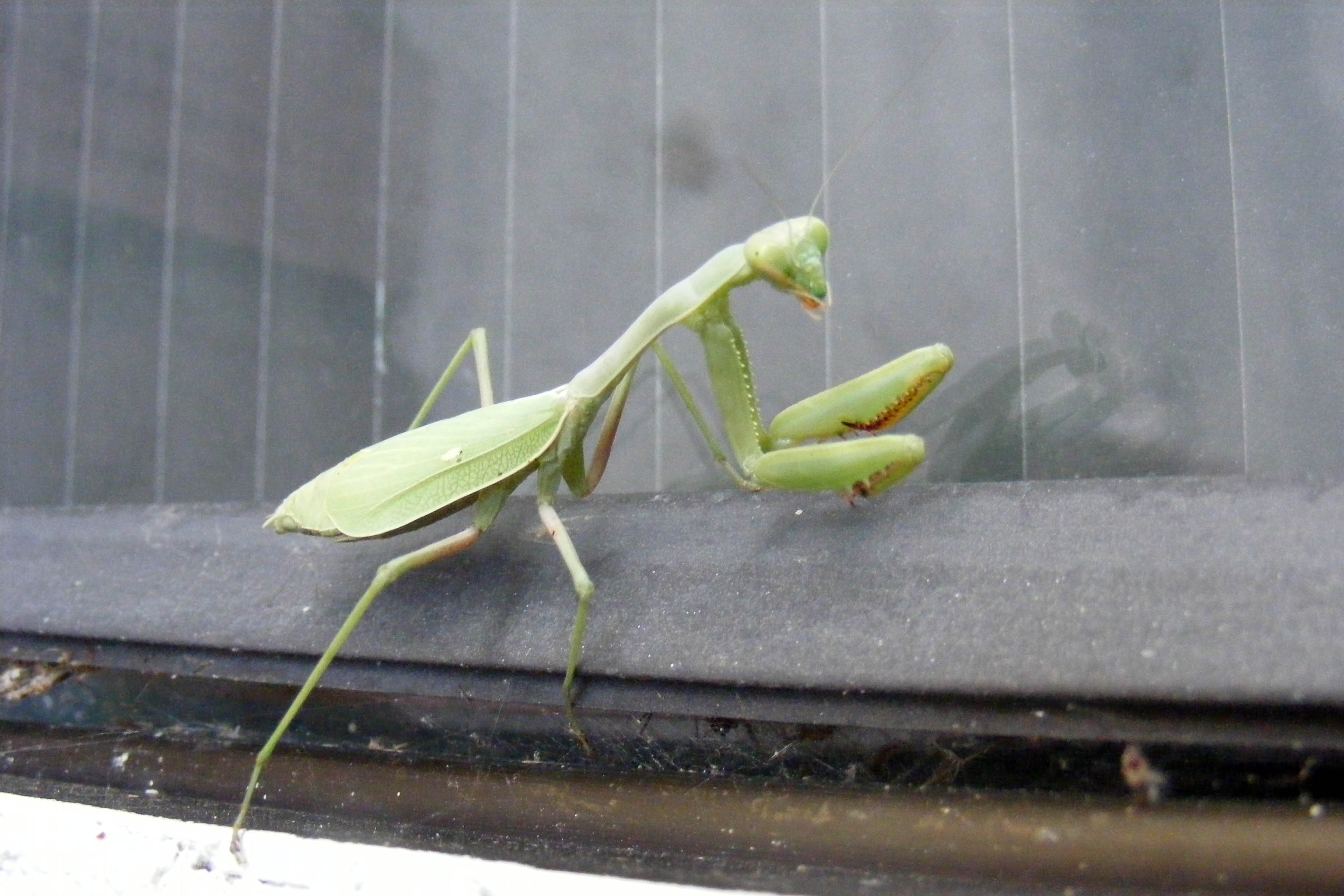
Adult female Stagmomantis limbata

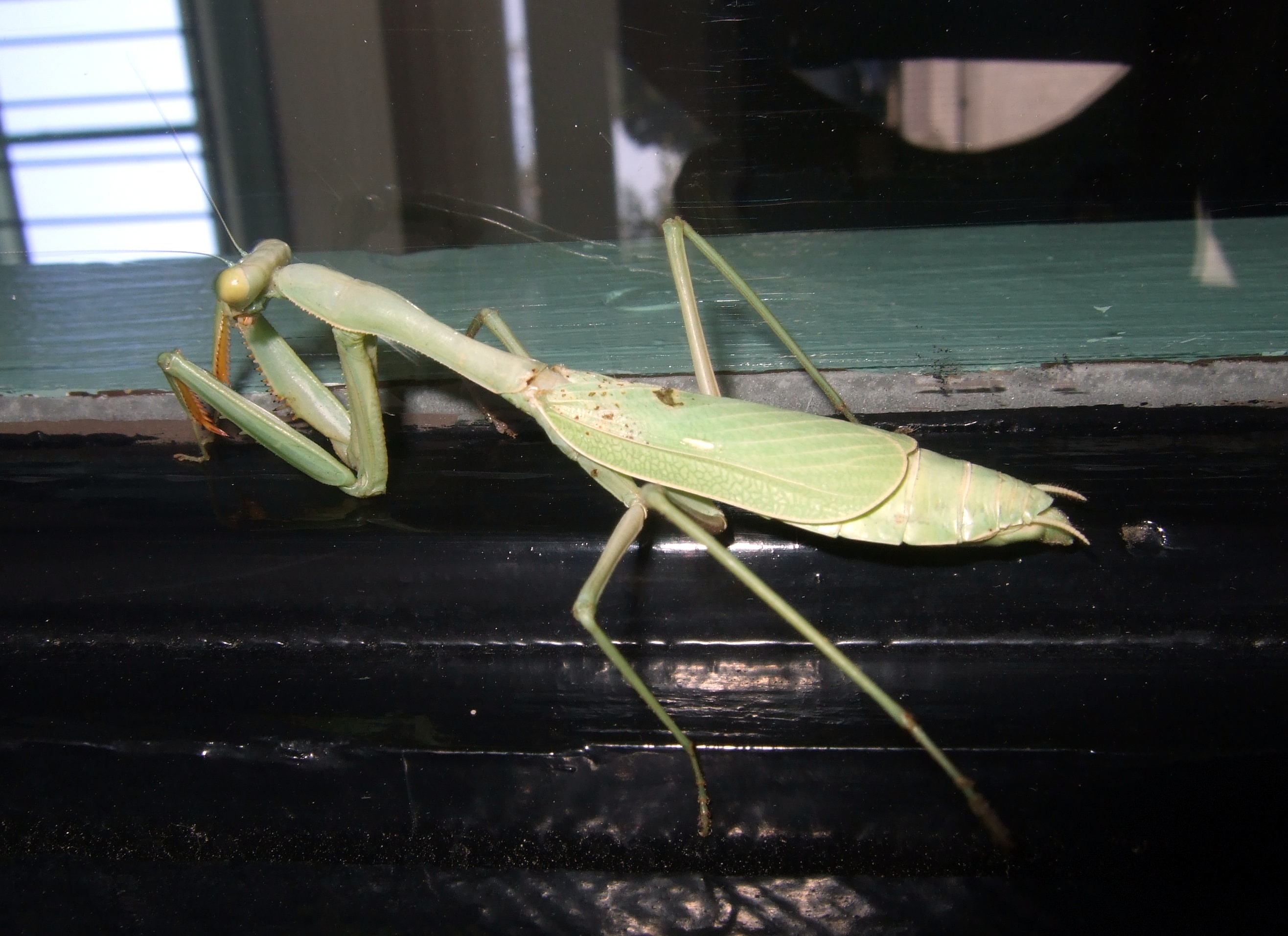
Adult female Stagmomantis limbata, lateral view

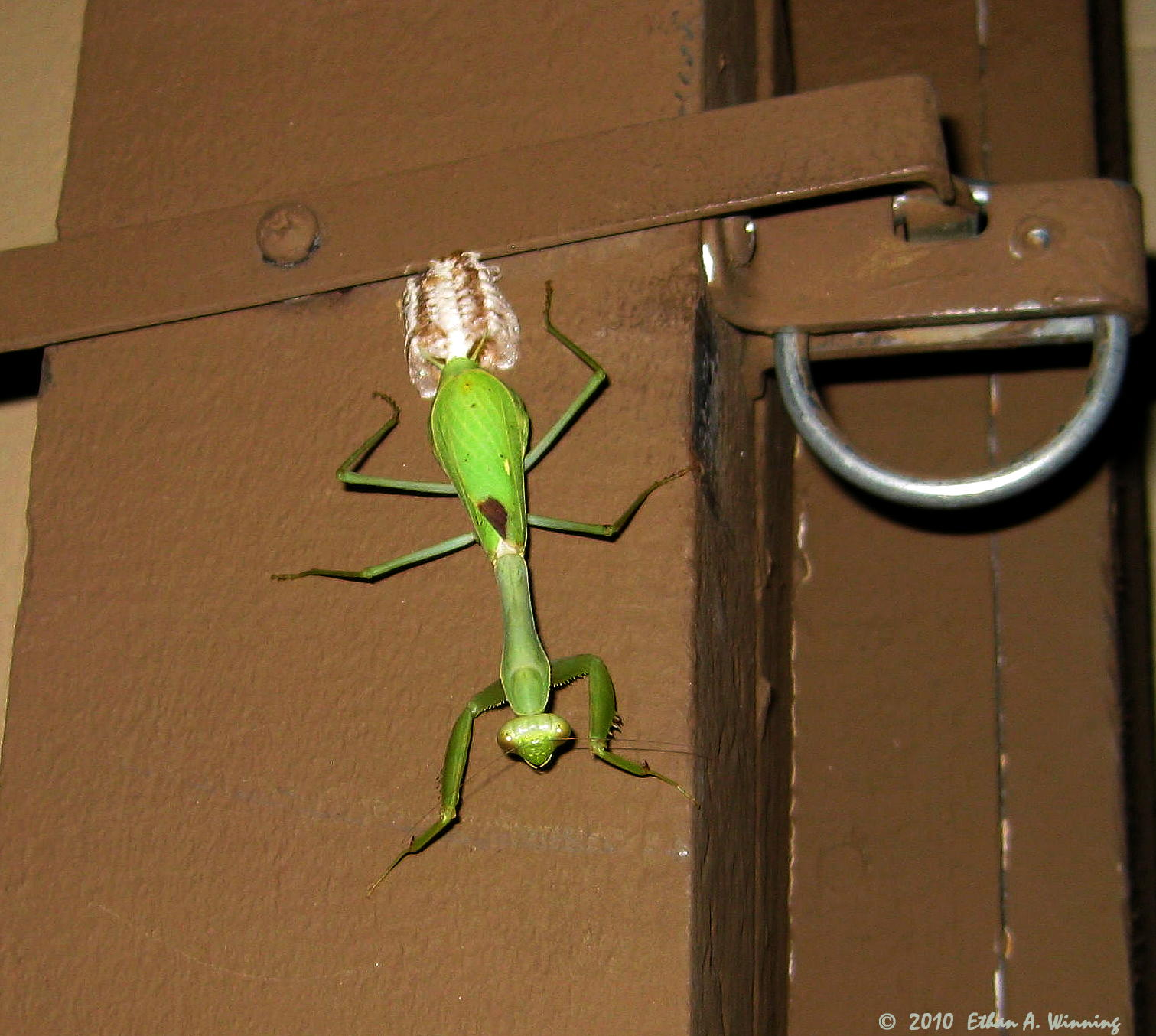
Adult female Stagmomantis limbata laying an ootheca

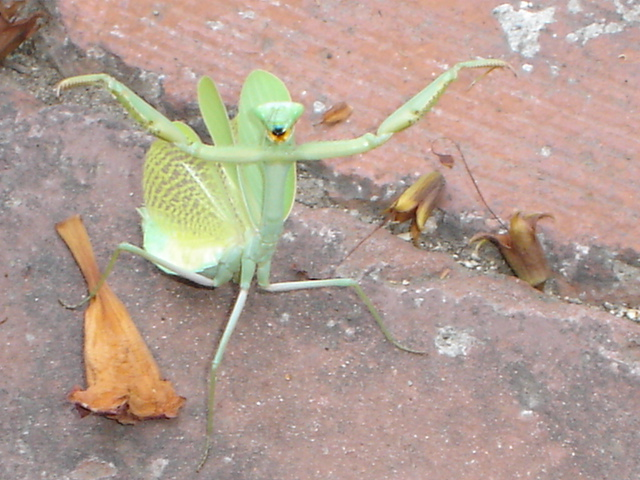
Adult female Stagmomantis limbata performing a threat display

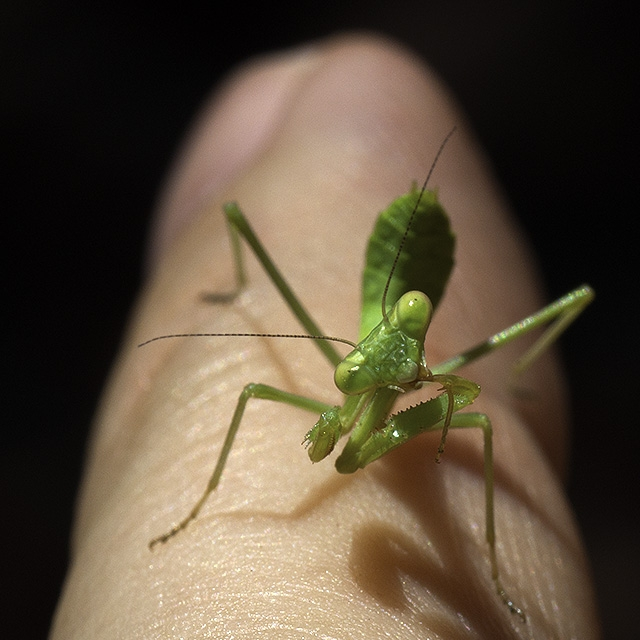
A nymph on a man's finger

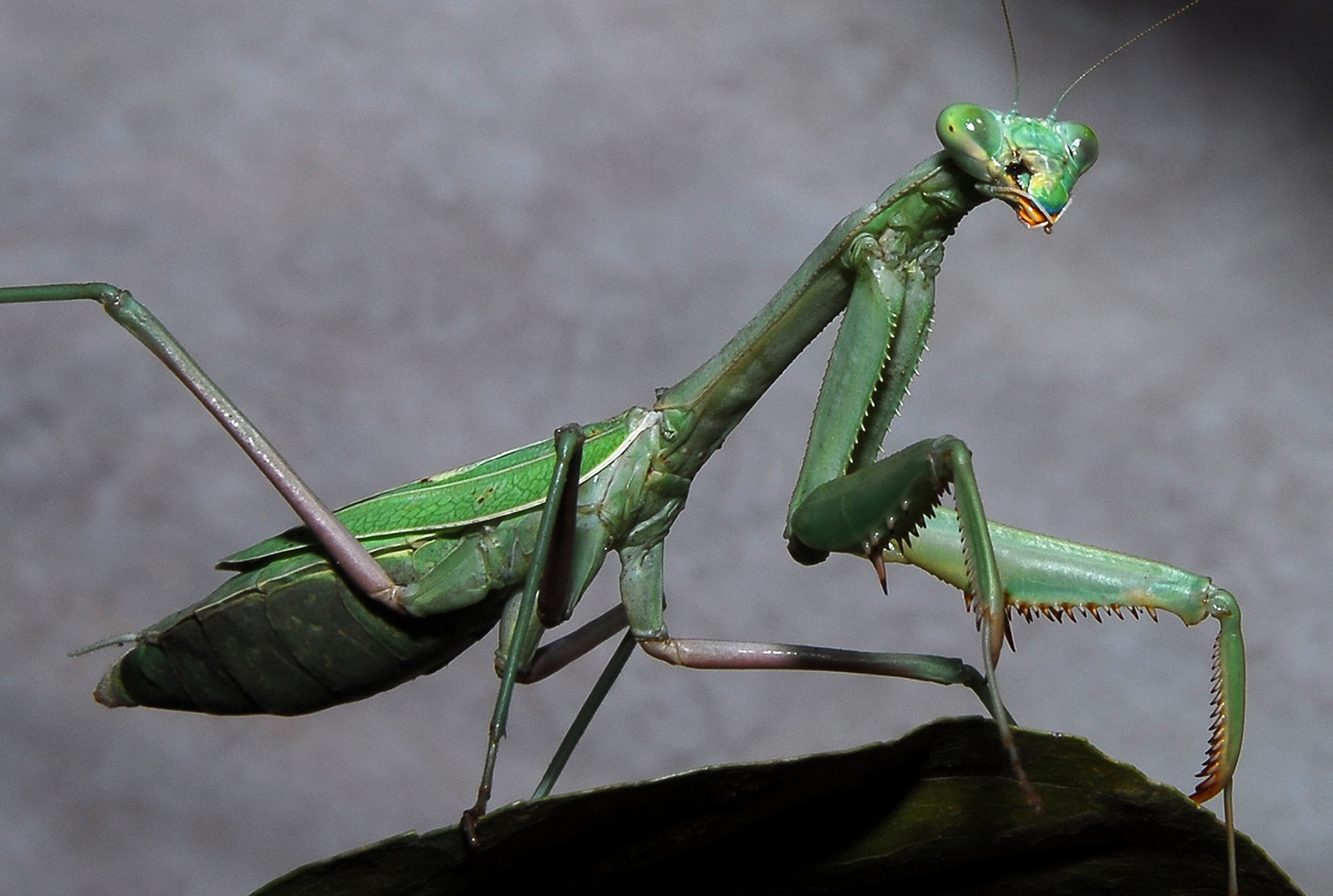
Adult female

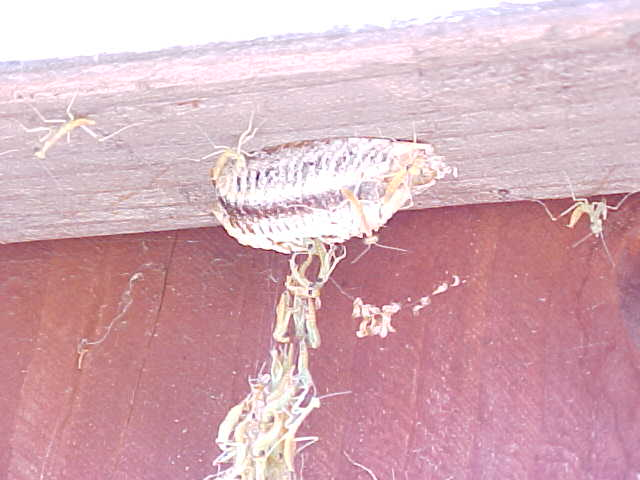
Ootheca hatching

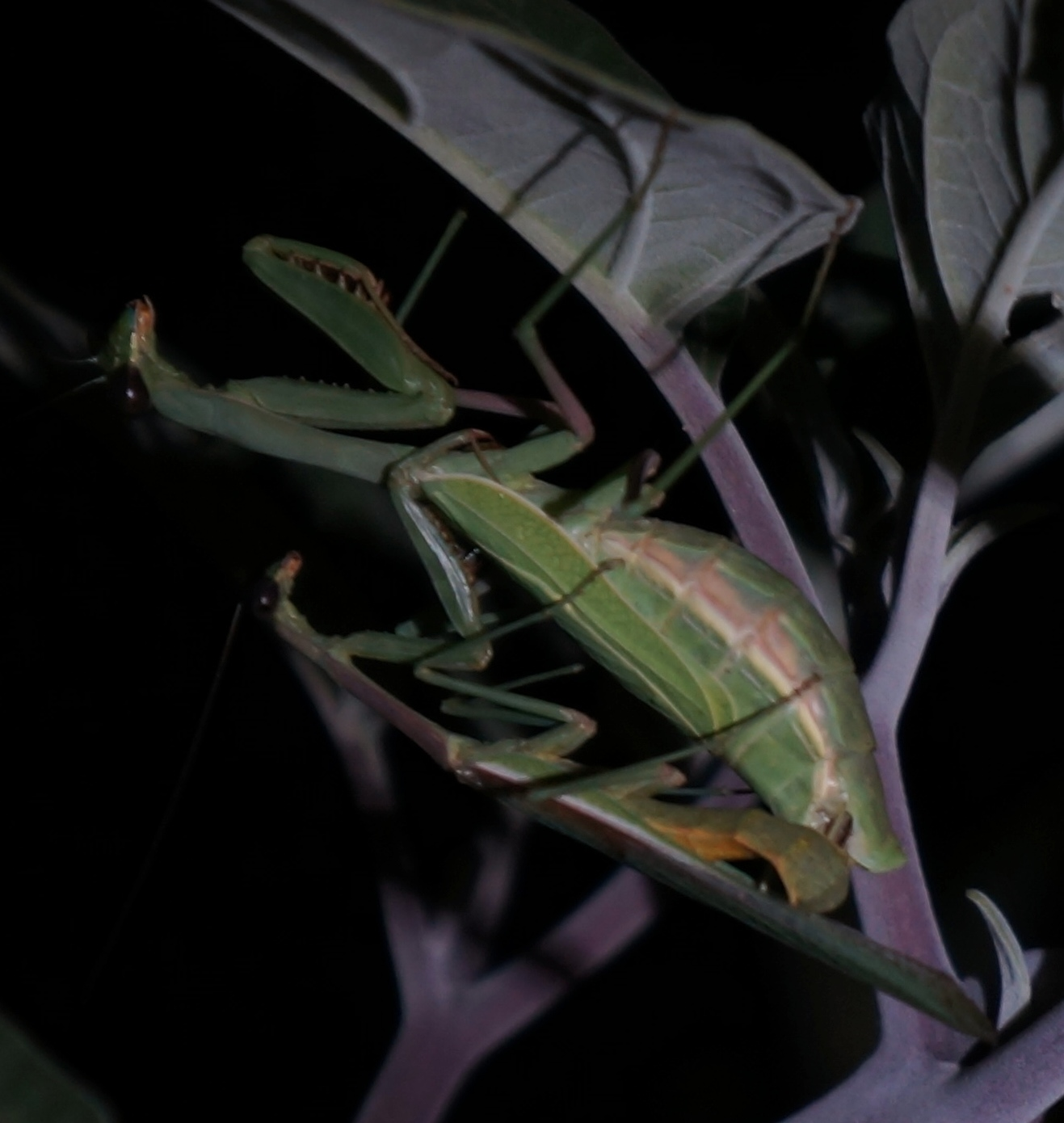
Mating pair

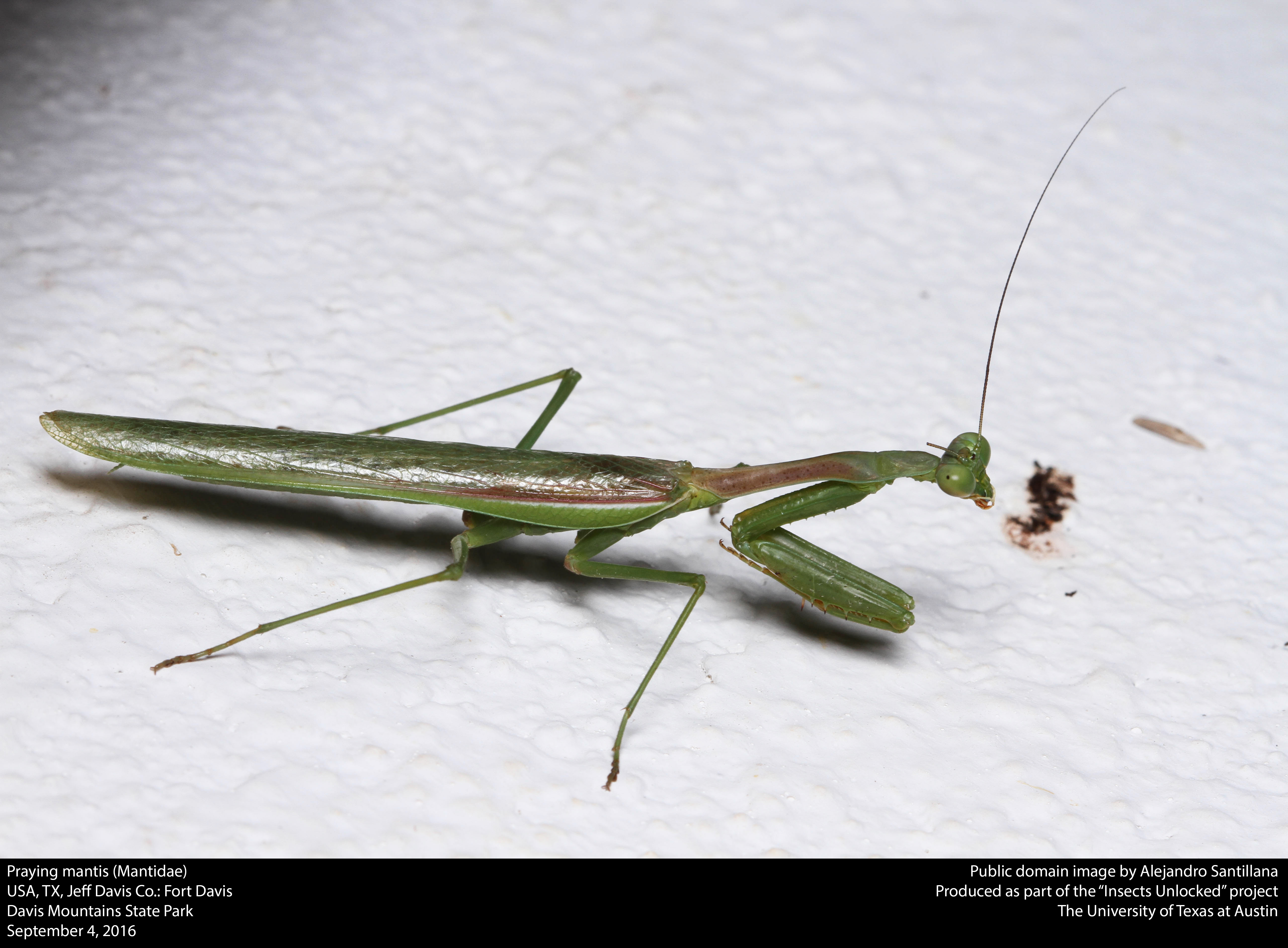
Adult male

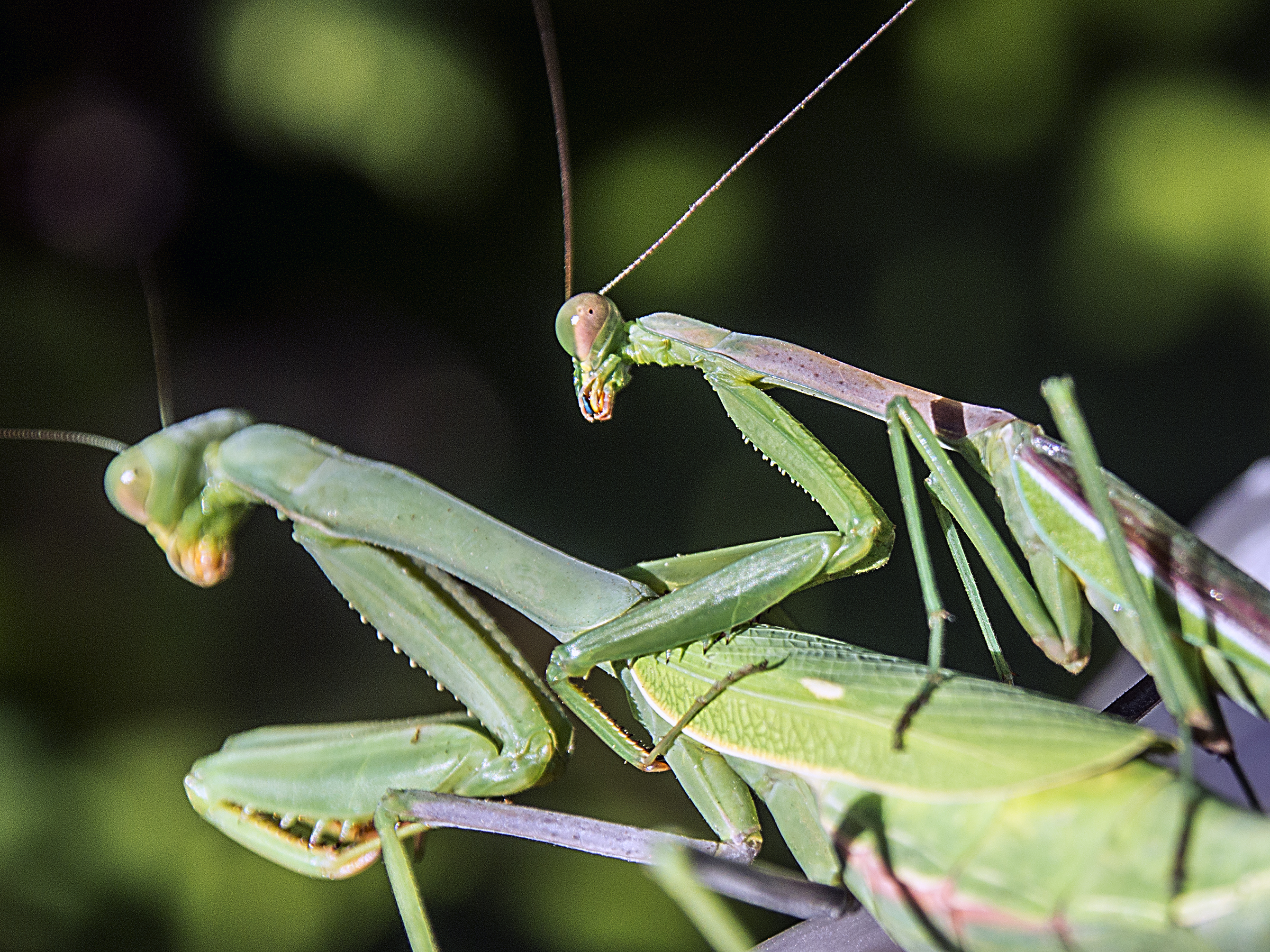

== See also ==
- Arizona Mantis
- Mountain Mantis
- List of mantis genera and species
