= Stagmomantis montana =

Scientific classification
- Kingdom: Animalia
- Phylum: Arthropoda
- Clade: Pancrustacea
- Class: Insecta
- Order: Mantodea
- Family: Mantidae
- Genus: Stagmomantis
- Species: S. montana

Binomial name
- Stagmomantis montana (Rehn, 1935)

Species of praying mantis

Stagmomantis montana (Rehn, 1935), common name Mountain mantis, is a species of praying mantis in the family Mantidae. They are native to Mexico and Central America. S. montana sinaloae has been identified as a subspecies.
