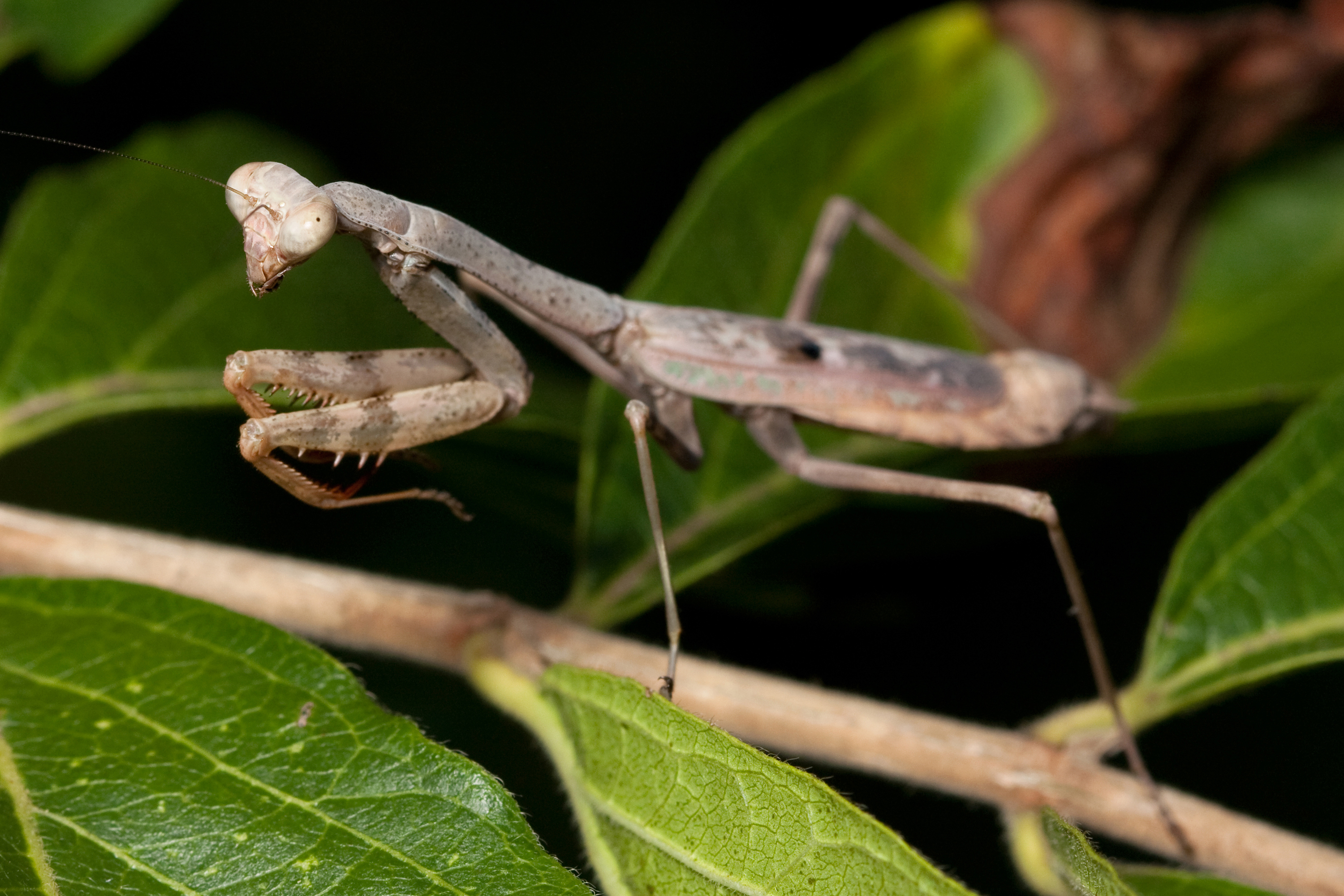
- Adult female Stagmomantis carolina

Scientific classification
- Kingdom: Animalia
- Phylum: Arthropoda
- Clade: Pancrustacea
- Class: Insecta
- Order: Mantodea
- Family: Mantidae
- Tribe: Stagmomantini
- Genus: Stagmomantis; Saussure, 1869

Synonyms
- Auromantis Giglio-Tos, 1917; Bactromantis Kirby, 1904; Leptococe Rehn, 1911; Oromantis Giglio-Tos, 1917; Stauromantis Giglio-Tos, 1917

= Stagmomantis =

Genus of mantis

Stagmomantis is a genus of mantis consisting of 24 species found in the Americas.

== Description ==
Stagmomantis species are medium sized, generally measuring around four to six centimeters, with females being larger than males. Individuals can be mixes of green and brown, as well as gray. Both males and females have wings, with males' being noticeably larger. Despite having shorter wings, female Stagmomantis are larger in length and breadth.

== Environment ==
Species can be found throughout North and South America, ranging from around 40° N in the United States to 8° S in Brazil. Stagmomantis can be found in a variety of habitats, from arid to tropical regions, including grasslands, deserts, rainforests, and even urban environments.

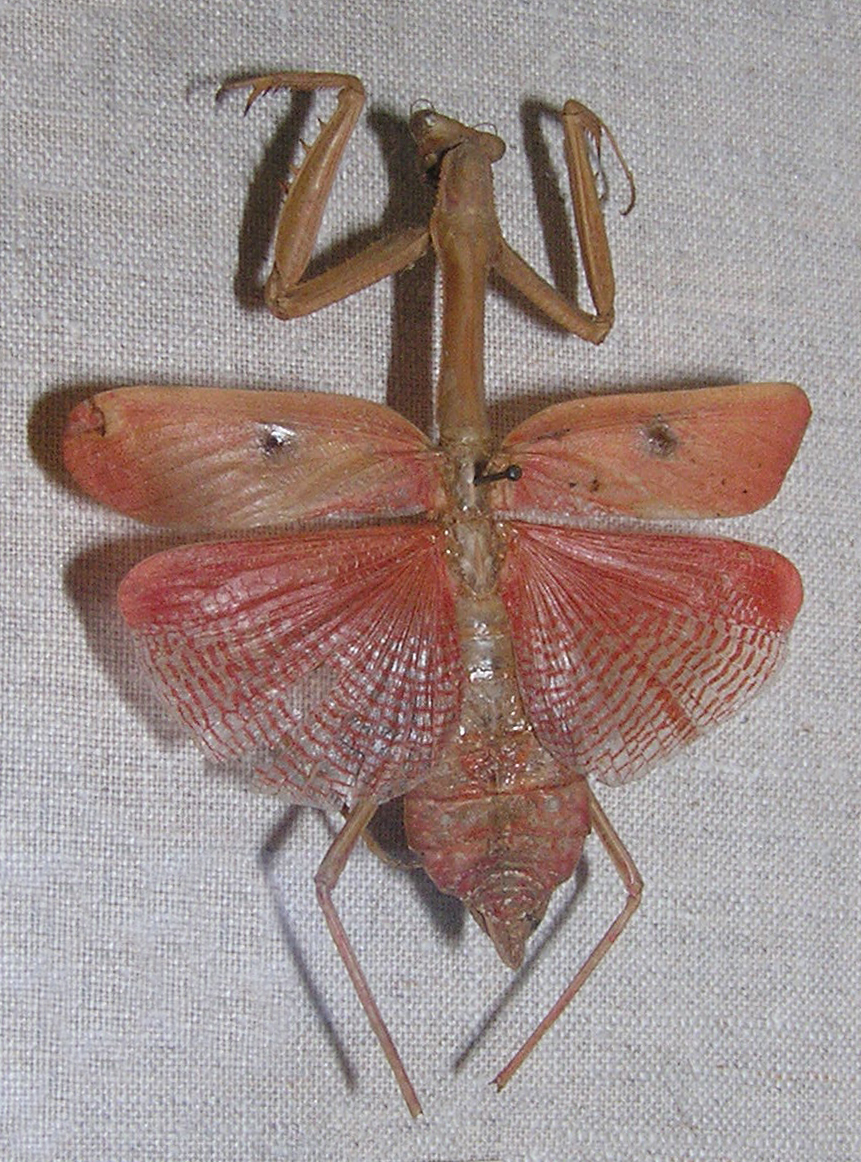
Adult female S. carolina

== Species ==
There are 24 recognized species of Stagmomantis, with S. montana having the additional subspecies S. montana sinaloae.

Subgenera

- Subgenus Auromantis Giglio-Tos, 1917
  - S. limbata Hahn, 1935
  - S. montana Saussure & Zehntner, 1894
- Subgenus Longicorpus Anderson, 2020
  - S. floridensis Davis, 1919
- Subgenus Nigralora Anderson, 2020
  - S. clauseni Garikipati, 2024
  - S. colorata Hebard, 1922
  - S. wheelerii Thomas, 1875
- Subgenus Oromantis Giglio-Tos, 1917
  - S. nahua Saussure, 1869
  - S. vicina Saussure, 1870
- Subgenus Parviletum Anderson, 2020
  - S. fraterna Saussure & Zehntner, 1894
- Subgenus Stagmomantis Saussure, 1869
  - S. carolina Linné, 1763
  - S. conspurcata Serville, 1839
  - S. hebardi Rehn, 1935
  - S. resacae Anderson, 2021
  - S. thoracica Rehn, 1911
  - S. tolteca Saussure, 1861
- Subgenus Stauromantis Giglio-Tos, 1917
  - S. pagana Saussure, 1870
  - S. parvidentata Beier, 1931
  - S. theophila Rehn, 1904
- Subgenus Tenuecedes Anderson, 2020
  - S. gracilipes Rehn, 1907
- Subgenus Uromantis Giglio-Tos, 1917
  - S. heterogamia Saussure & Zehntner, 1894
  - S. venusta Saussure & Zehntner, 1894

== Gallery ==
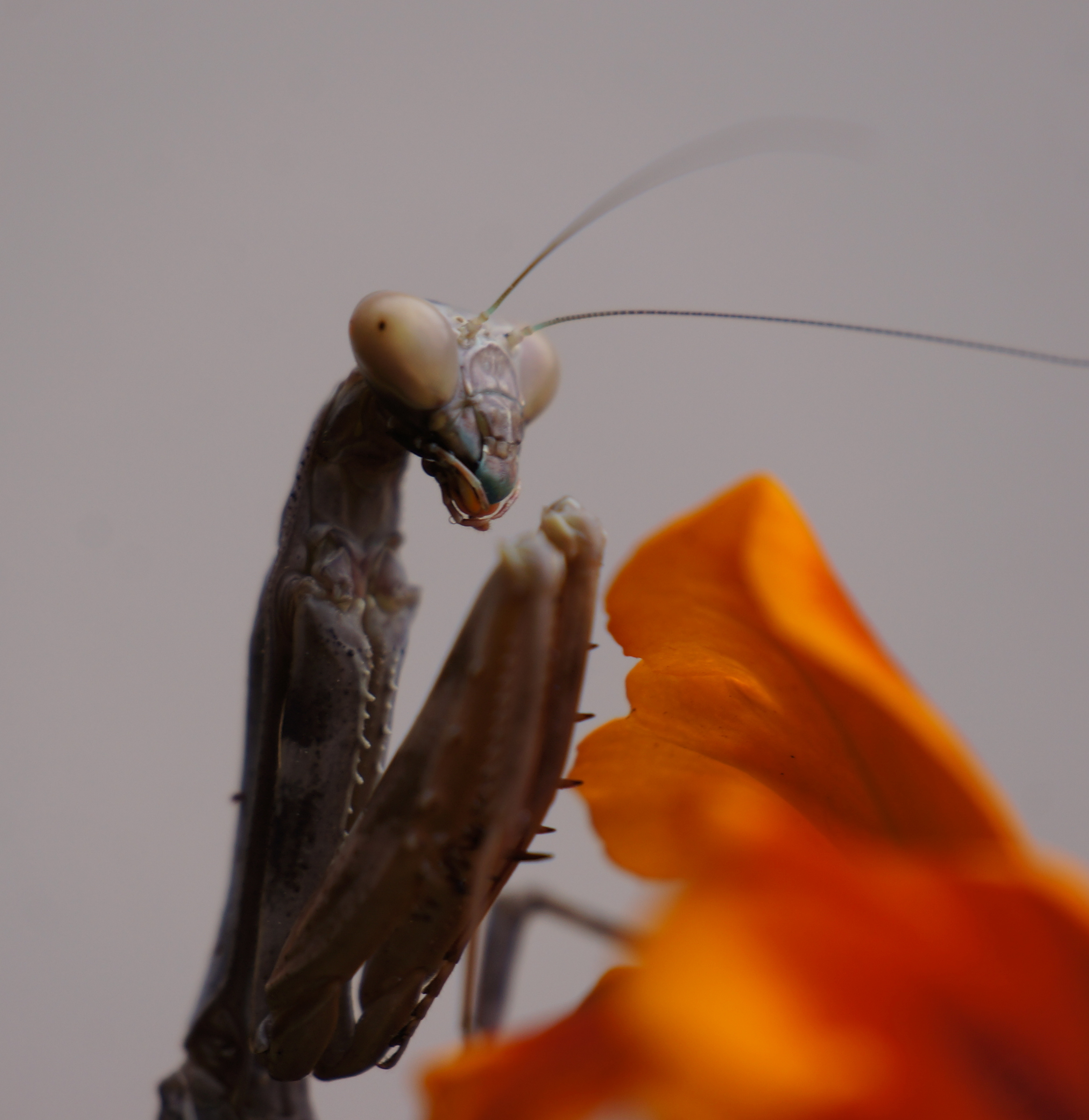
Closeup of a Stagmomantis limbata

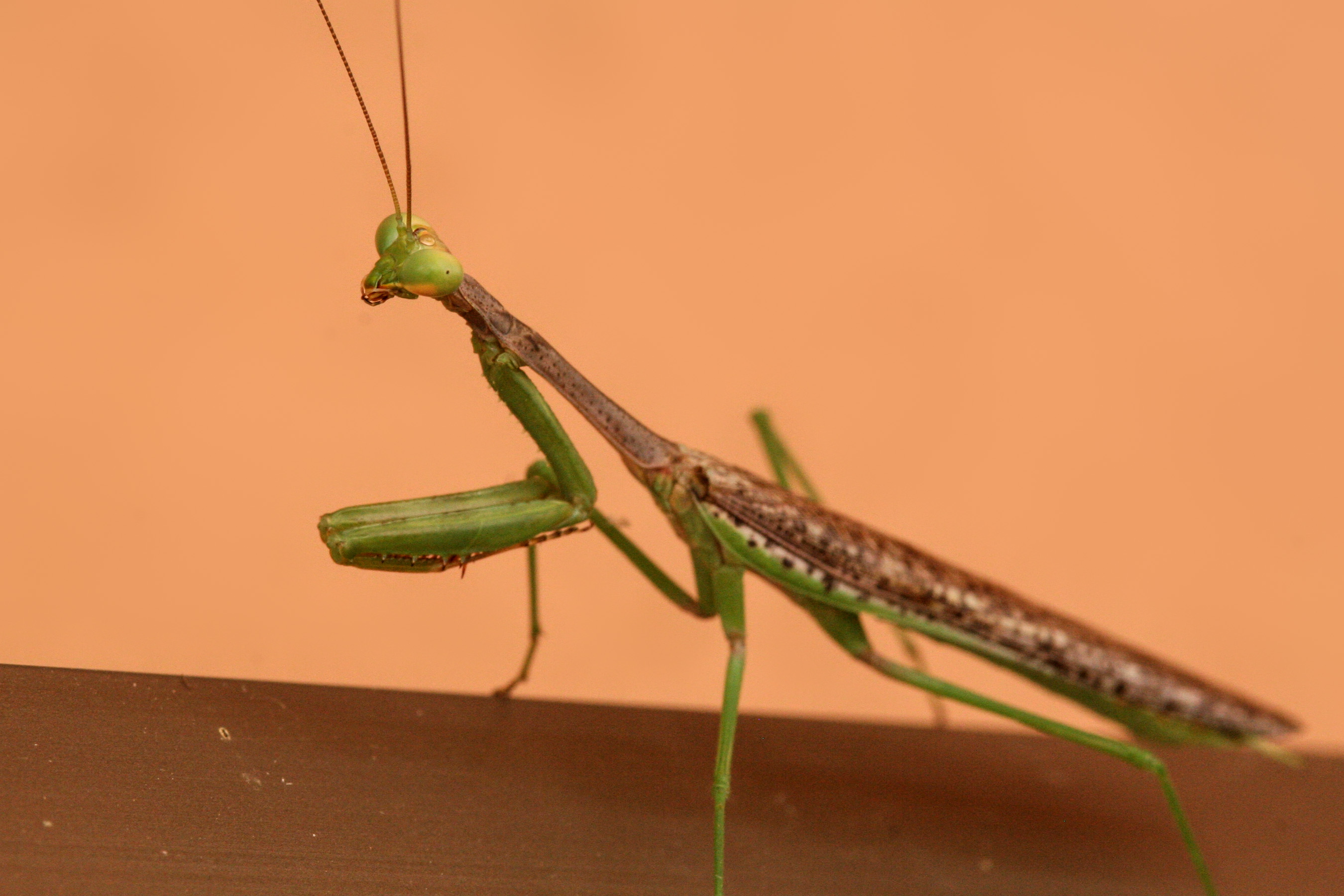
Adult Male Sonoran Tiger Mantis (Stagmomantis clauseni)

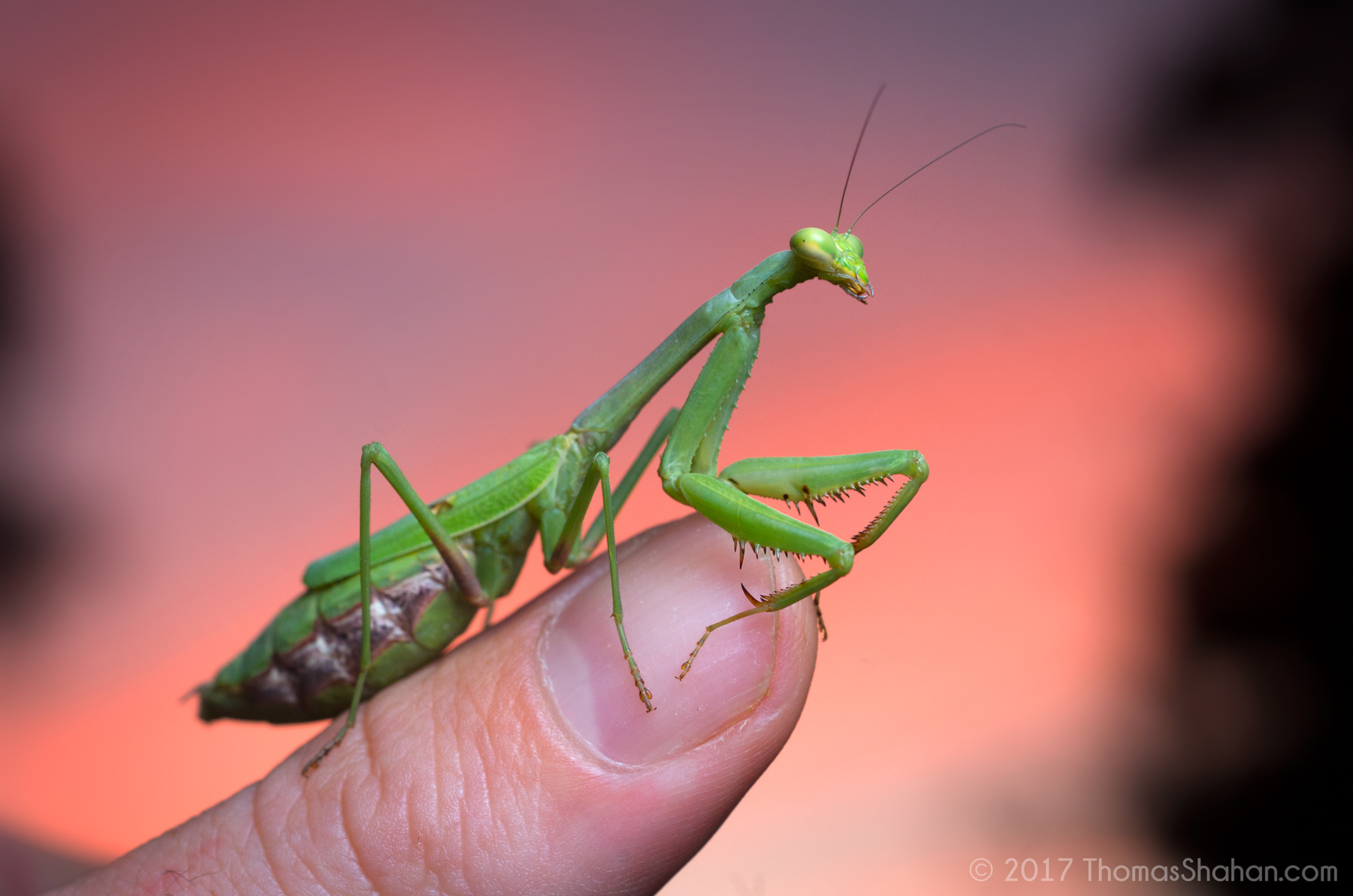
Adult female Stagmomantis carolina (Carolina Mantis)

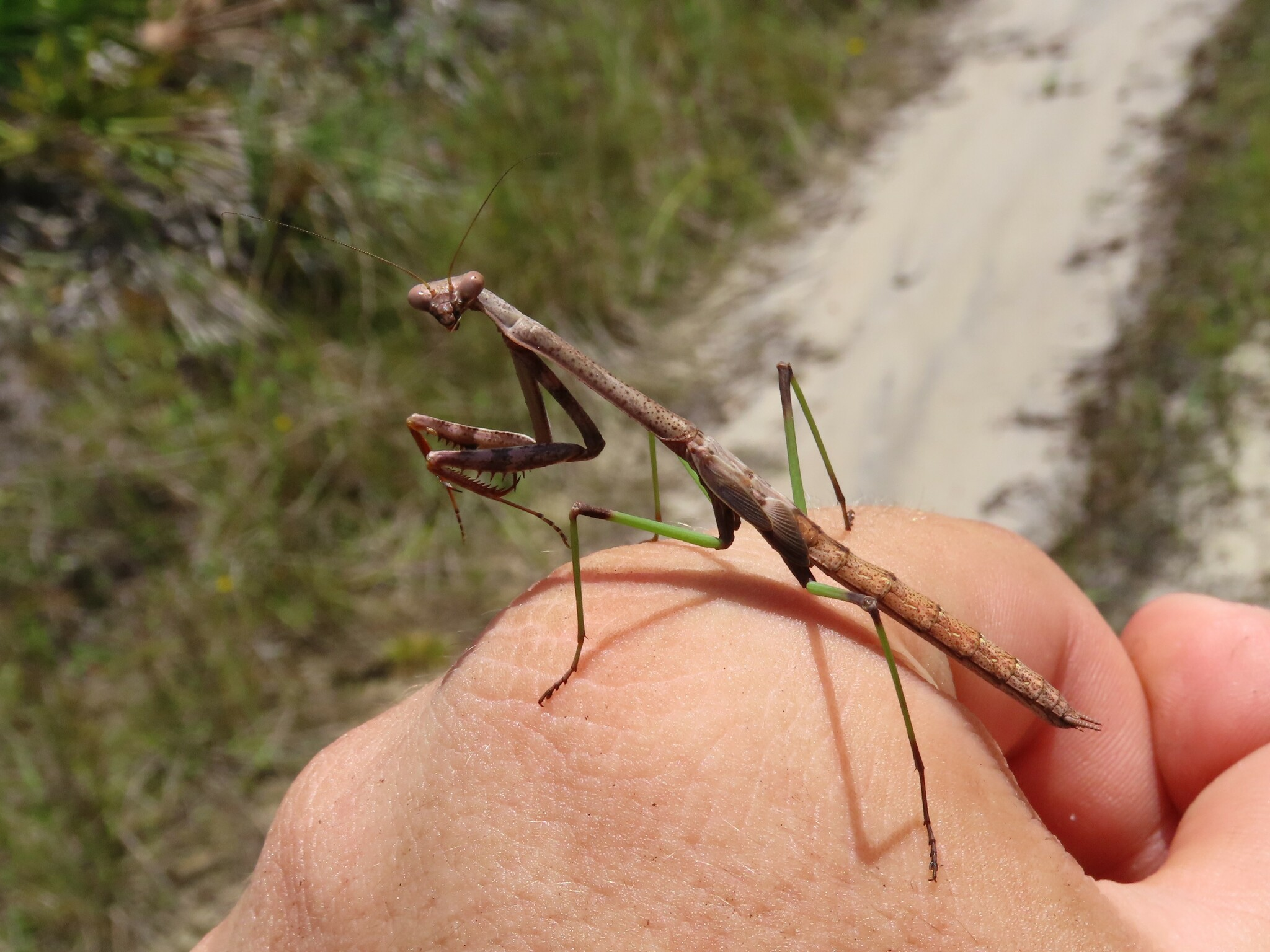
Stagmomantis floridensis

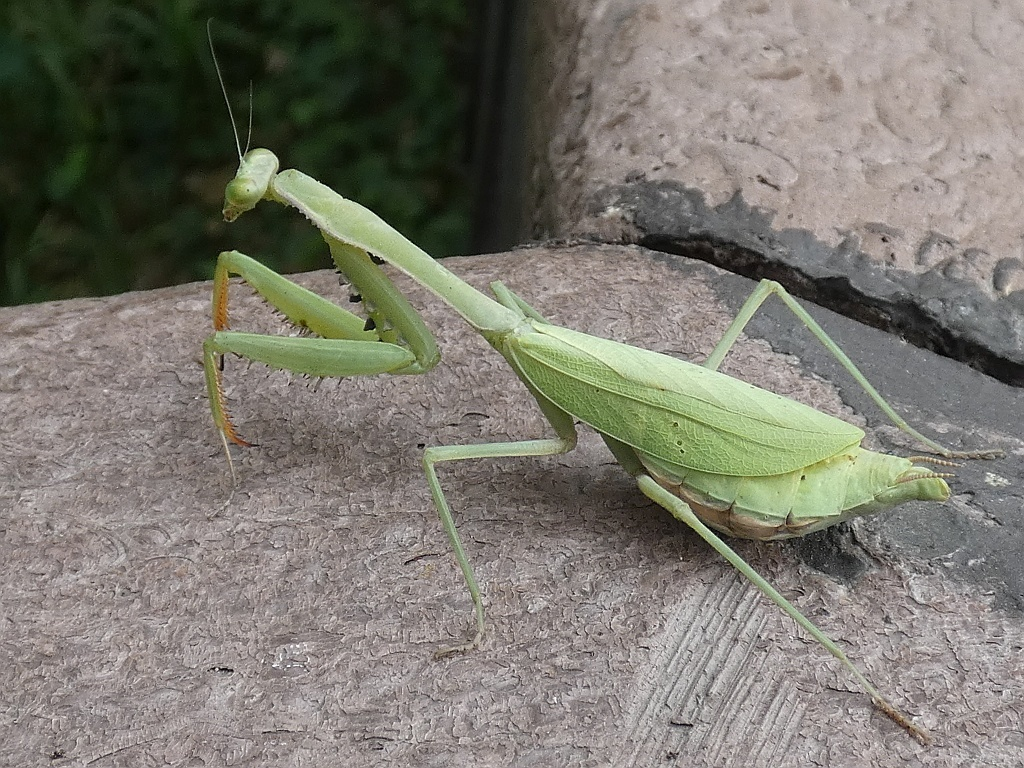
Stagmomantis theophila (Thorny-armed Mantis)

== See also ==
- List of mantis genera and species
