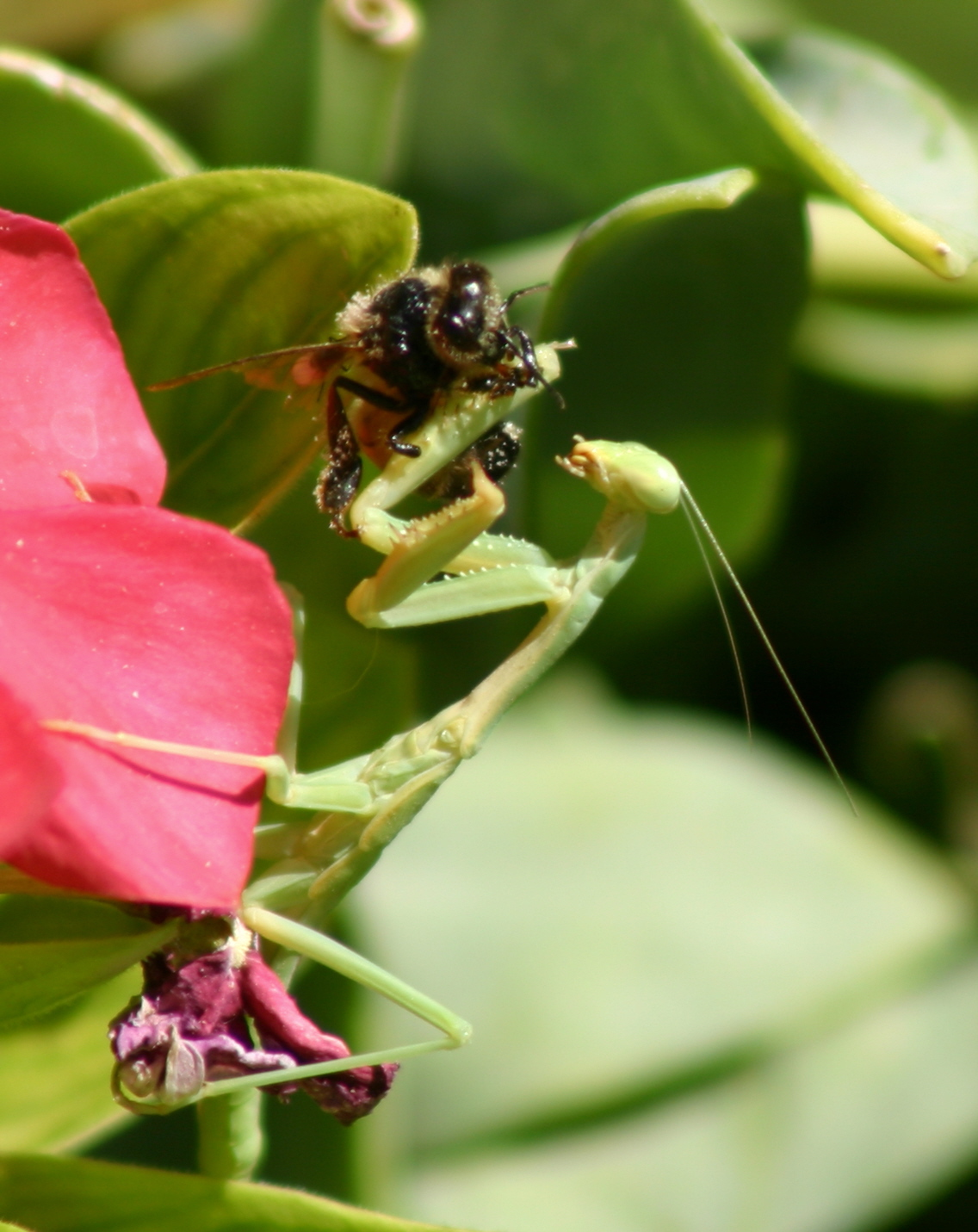

Scientific classification
- Kingdom: Animalia
- Phylum: Arthropoda
- Clade: Pancrustacea
- Class: Insecta
- Order: Mantodea
- Family: Mantidae
- Subfamily: Stagmomantinae; Ehrmann. 2002

= Stagmomantinae =

Subfamily of praying mantises

The Stagmomantinae are a subfamily of mantids within the family Mantidae, found in the Americas.

== Tribes and Genera ==
The Mantodea Species File lists five genera in two tribes:

=== Antemnini ===
- Antemna Stal, 1877
- Hondurantemna Rodrigues, Rivera, Reid & Svenson, 2017

=== Stagmomantini ===
- Isomantis Giglio-Tos, 1917
- Phasmomantis Saussure, 1869
- Stagmomantis Saussure, 1869
- Tauromantis Giglio-Tos, 1917
