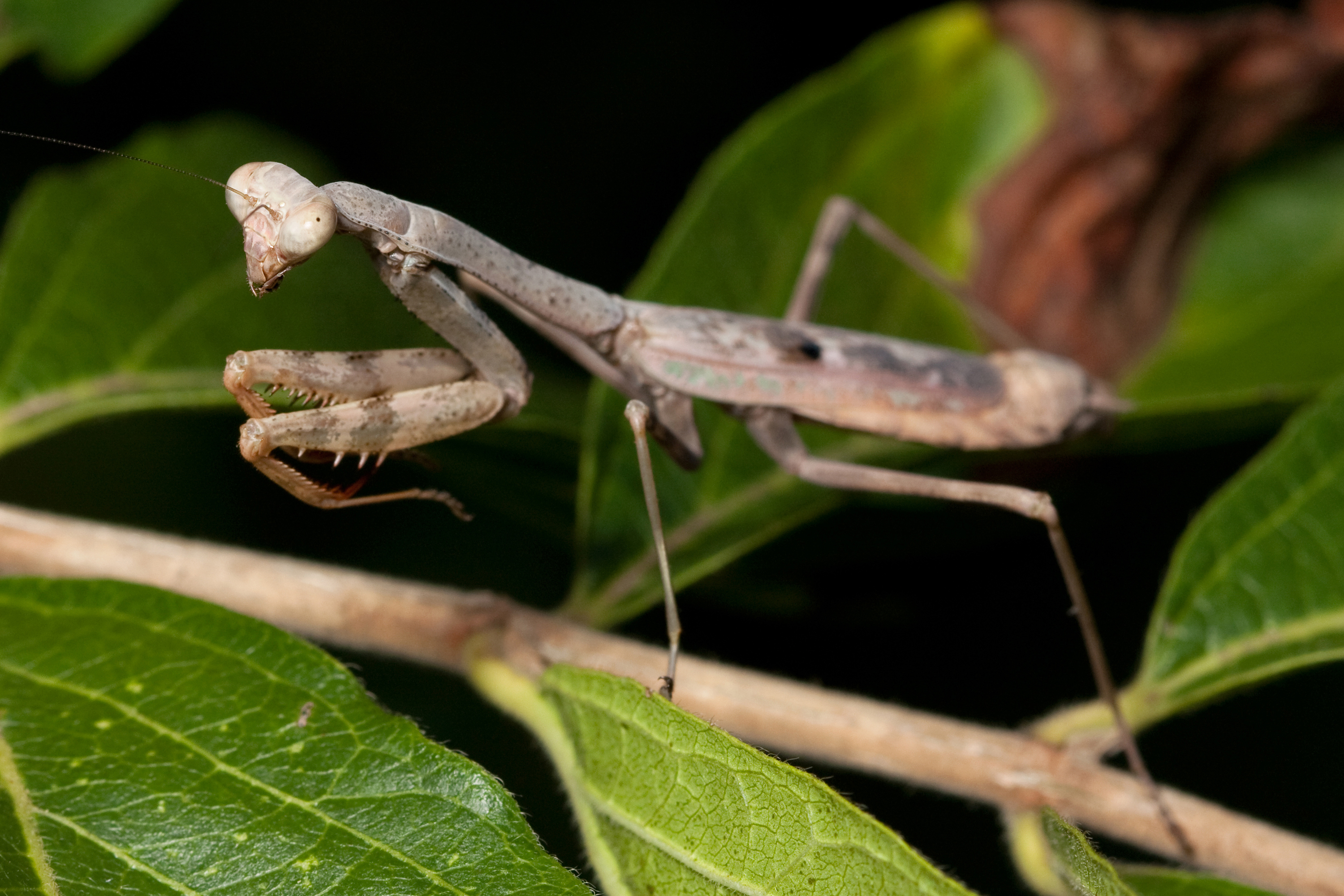
- Adult female
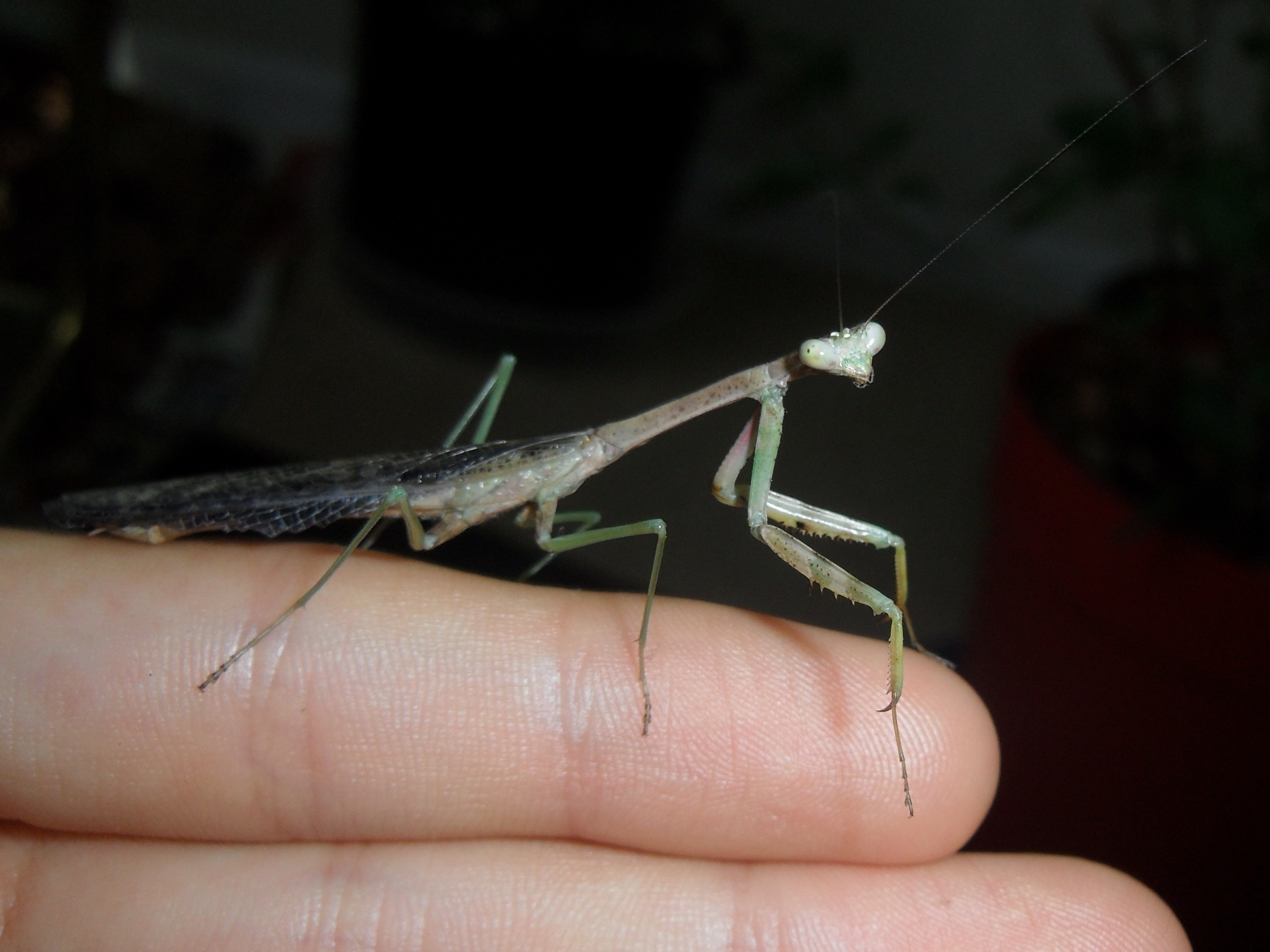
- Adult male

Scientific classification
- Kingdom: Animalia
- Phylum: Arthropoda
- Clade: Pancrustacea
- Class: Insecta
- Order: Mantodea
- Family: Mantidae
- Genus: Stagmomantis
- Species: S. carolina

Binomial name
- Stagmomantis carolina (Johansson, 1763)

Synonyms
- List: Gryllus carolinus Johansson, 1763; Bactromantis parvula [?]; Stagmomantis americana (Taylor, 1862); Stagmomantis baculina (Westwood, 1889); Stagmomantis conspersa (Burmeister, 1838); Stagmomantis cuticularis (Serville, 1839); Stagmomantis dimidiata (Burmeister, 1838); Stagmomantis ferox (Saussure, 1859); Stagmomantis fuscata (Weber, 1801); Stagmomantis inquinata (Serville, 1839); Stagmomantis irrorata (Johansson, 1763); Stagmomantis maculosa (Chopard, 1912); Stagmomantis nordica (Giglio-Tos, 1917); Stagmomantis parvula (Goeze, 1778); Stagmomantis polita (Giglio-Tos, 1917); Stagmomantis simplex (Giglio-Tos, 1917); Mantis stolli (Saussure, 1869); Stagmomantis thoracica (Rehn, 1911); Stagmomantis virga (Scudder, 1896); Mantis wheelerii (Thomas, 1875)

= Carolina mantis =

Species of praying mantis

The Carolina mantis (Stagmomantis carolina) is a species of praying mantis of the subfamily Stagmomantinae.

Sexual cannibalism occurs in roughly one quarter of all intersexual encounters of this species, though specimens of this species will engage in cannibalism regardless of age or gender if the opportunity presents itself.

The Carolina mantis is the state insect of South Carolina. Oothecae can be purchased in garden supply centers as a means of biological control of pest insects.

== Description ==
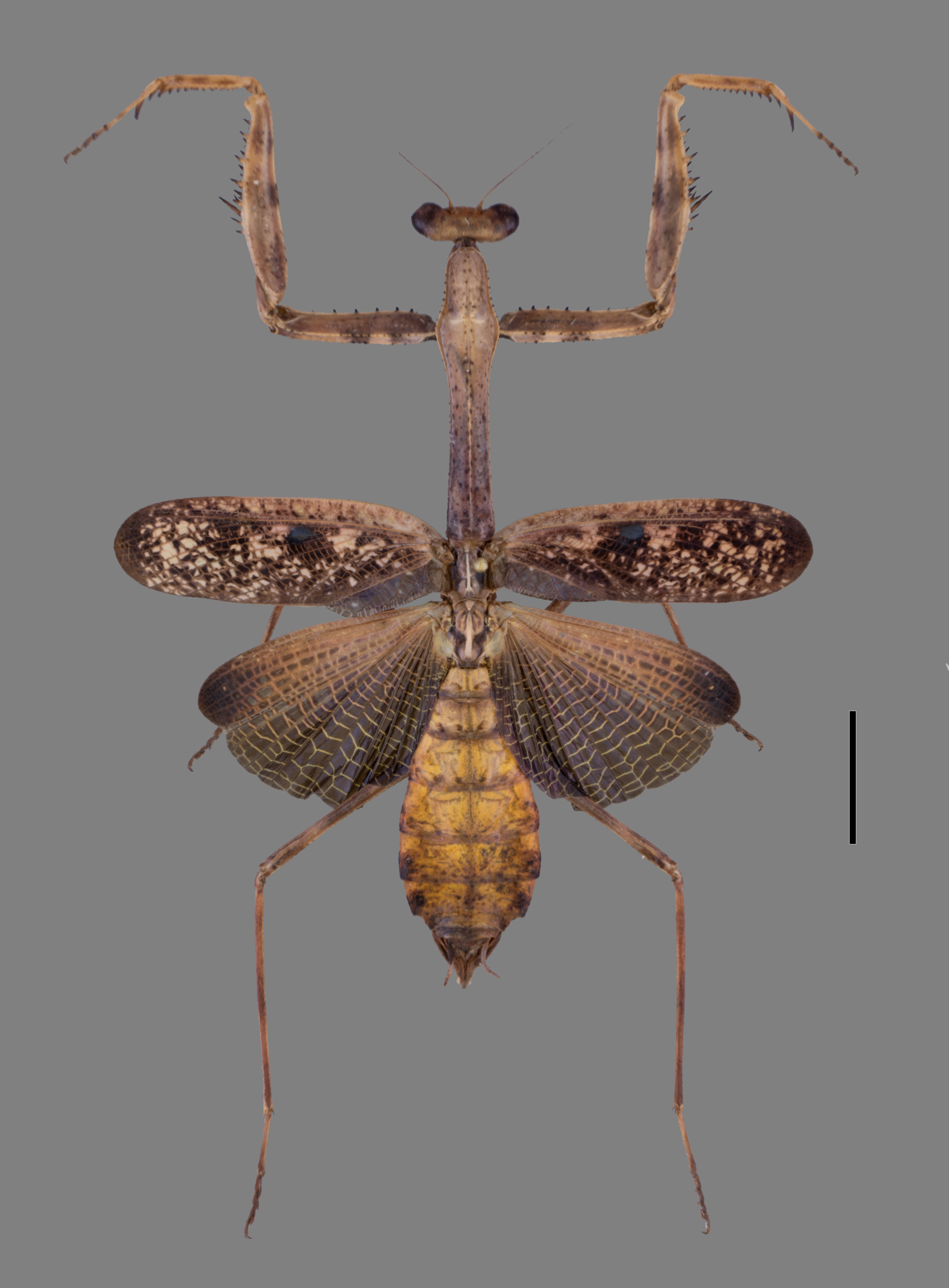
Dorsal view of a female collected from Baldwin County, Georgia. Scale bar indicates 1 cm.

Adult females are 47 to 60 millimetres (1.9–2.4 in) in length while adult males are usually about 54 millimetres (2.1 in) in length. First instar nymphs are 7–12 millimetres (0.28–0.47 in) in length. When the nymphs eat more, their abdomens get much longer.

The Carolina mantis has a dusty brown, gray or green color useful as camouflage in certain environments. The Carolina mantis' color varies because the nymphs are able to adjust their color to match the environment they are in at the time of molting. Instead of undergoing a complete metamorphosis, praying mantises molt and grow to an adult. They can adjust their color over each molt, if necessary, until they reach their final molt to adulthood.

An unusual trait is that its wings only extend three-quarters of the way down the abdomen in mature females, known as brachypterism; this trait is also seen in Iris oratoria, which can be distinguished by the large eyespots on the hind wings (inner wings) of both adult male and female Iris oratoria.

Both adult male and female Stagmomantis carolina have a dark-coloured dot on each of their forewings (outer wings), which may be partially hidden in a brown or dark colour morph individual.

== Gallery ==
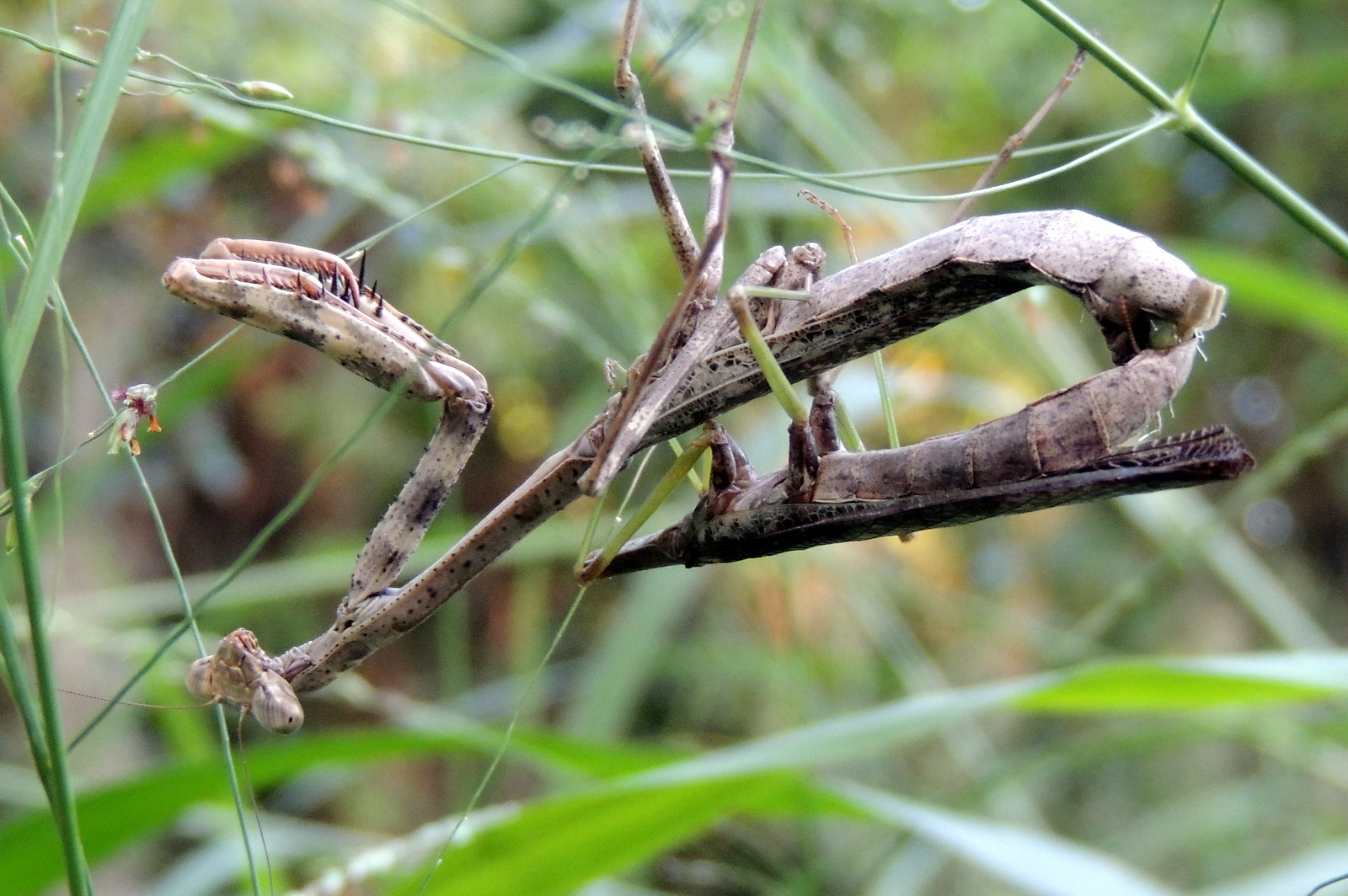
Female mating with a half-eaten male

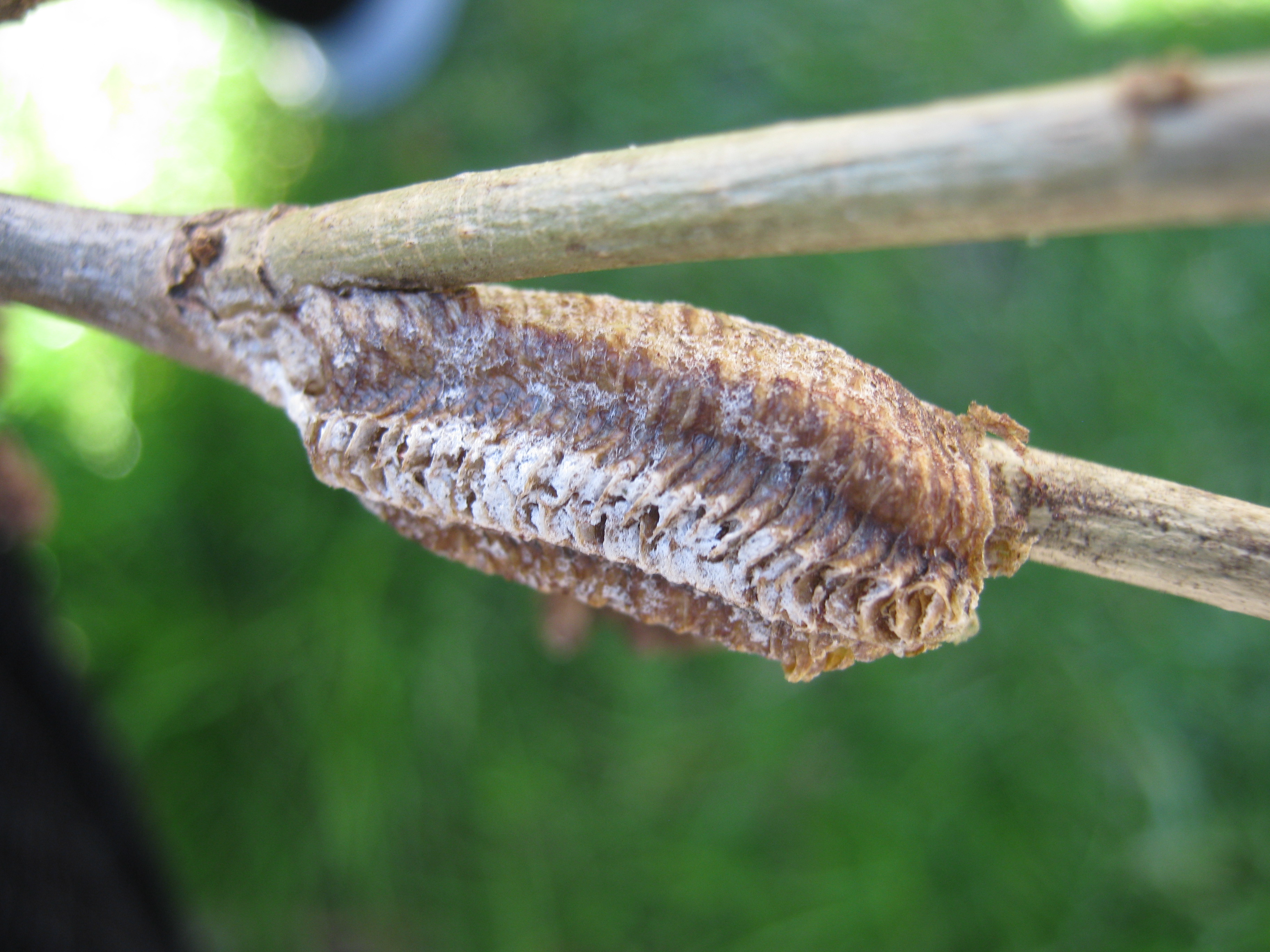
Ootheca

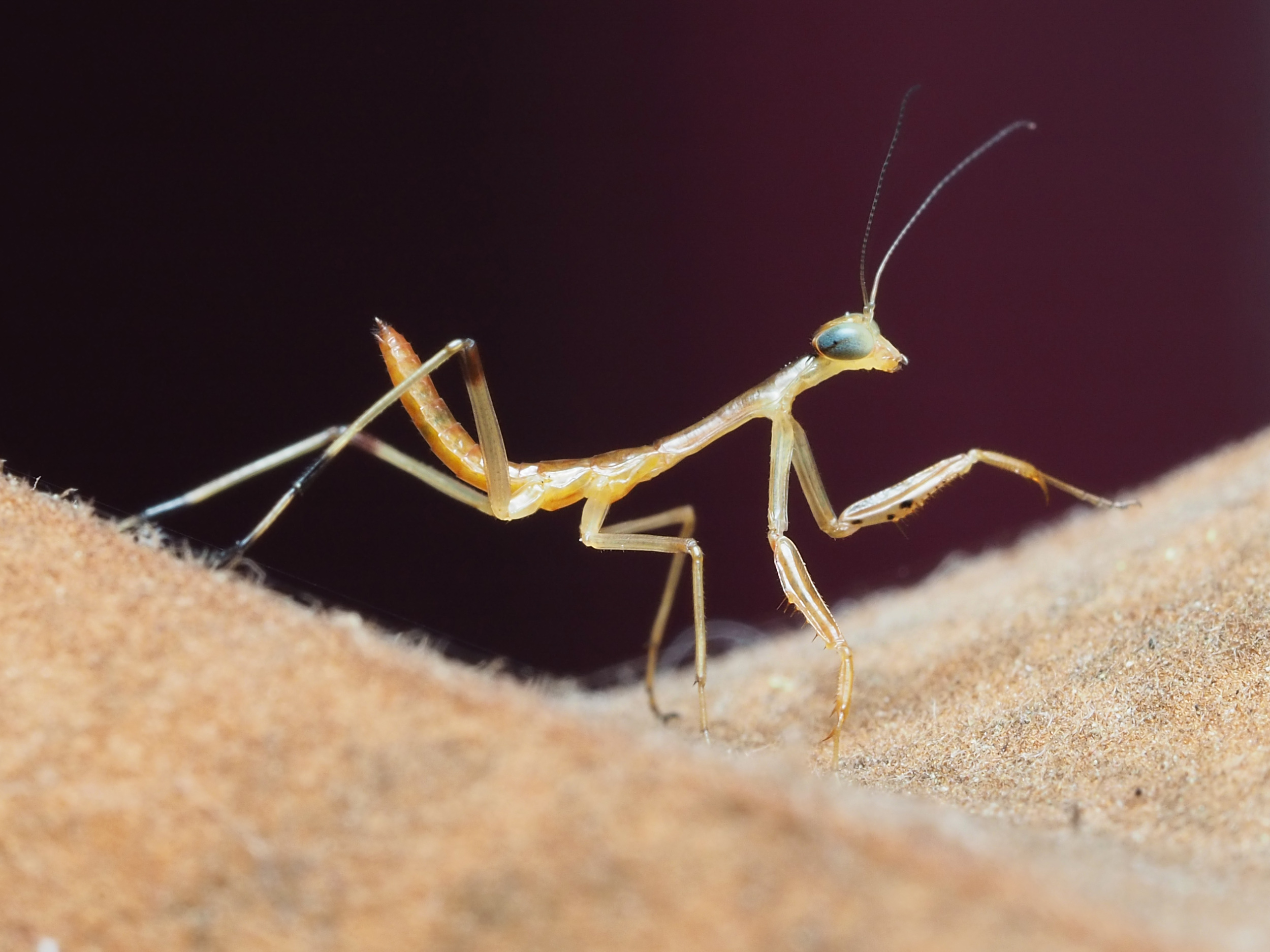
1st instar nymph

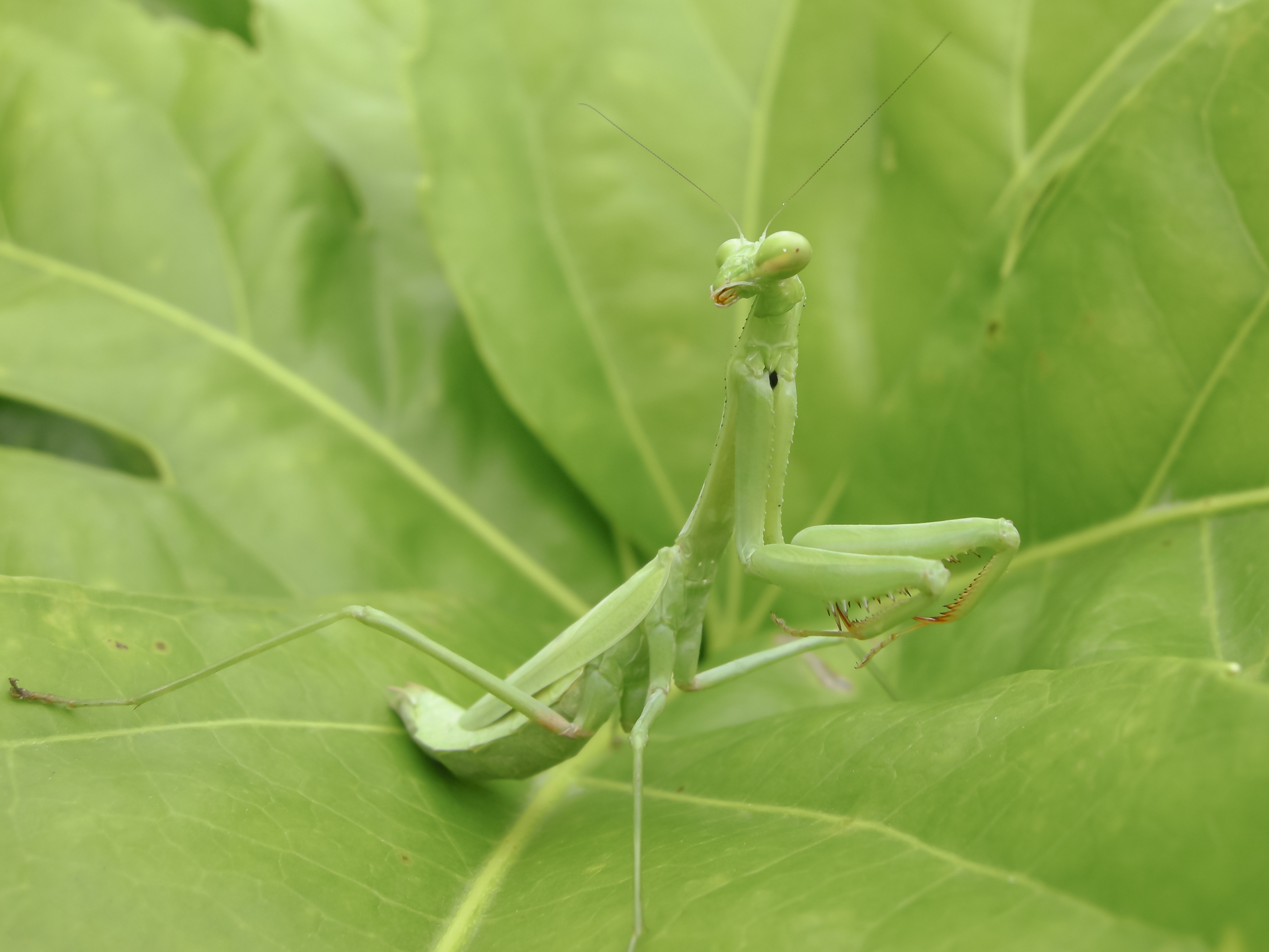

== Distribution and habitat ==
Stagmomantis carolina is native to the eastern coast of the United States. Contrary to popular belief, this species is not native throughout the entire Nearctic realm.
