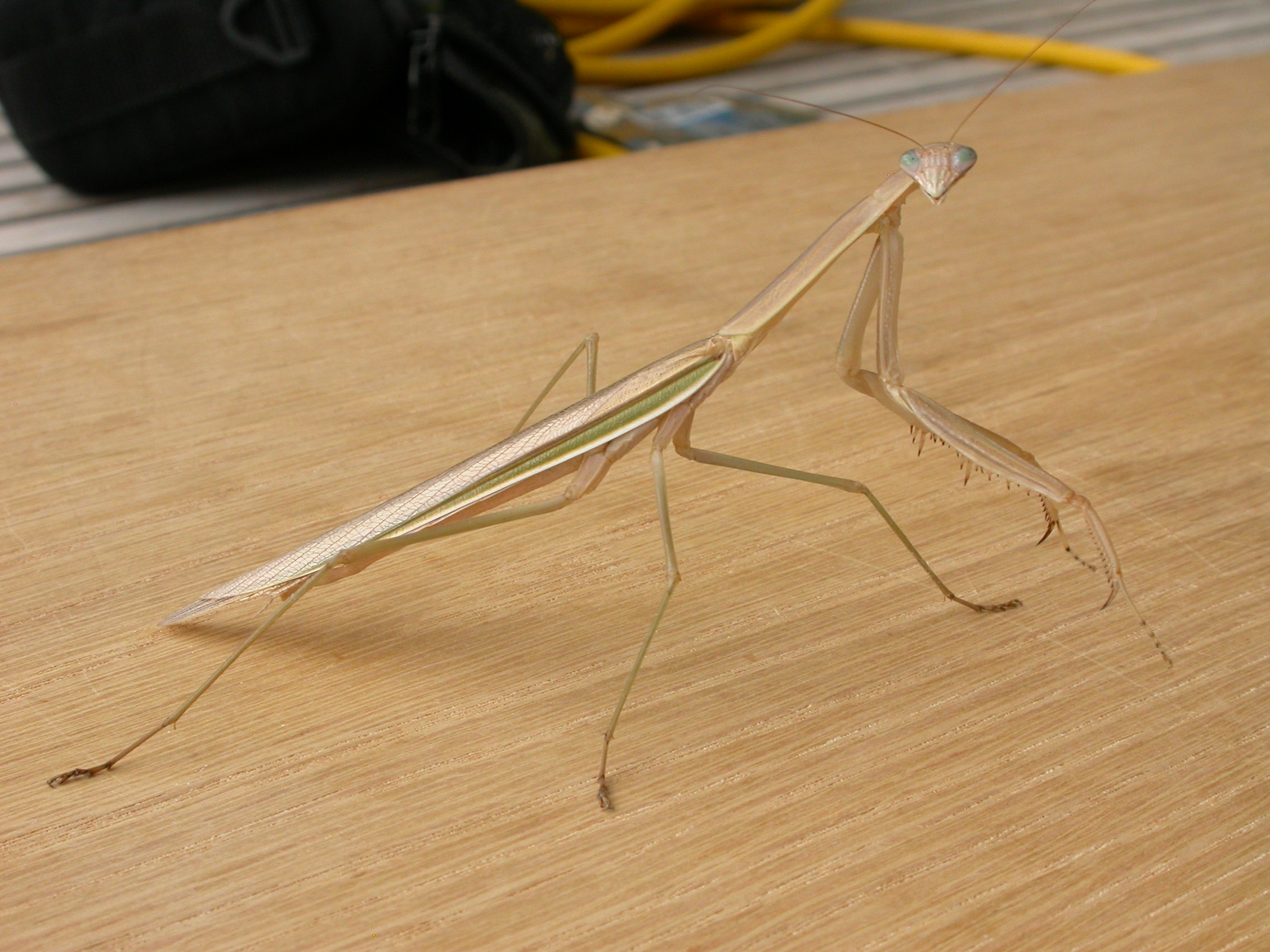
- Adult female

Scientific classification
- Kingdom: Animalia
- Phylum: Arthropoda
- Clade: Pancrustacea
- Class: Insecta
- Order: Mantodea
- Family: Mantidae
- Genus: Tenodera
- Species: T. australasiae

Binomial name
- Tenodera australasiae Leach, 1814

Synonyms
- Mantis australasiae (Leach, 1814); Mantis darchii (Mac Leay, 1827); Mantis tessellata (Burmeister, 1838)

= Tenodera australasiae =

Species of praying mantis

Tenodera australasiae, the purple-winged mantis, is species of praying mantis. Found throughout Australia, it is common in the eastern regions. Both males and females are capable of flight. The species has not been shown to be parthenogenetic.

== Range ==
All of Australia, but said to be absent in New Zealand.

== Diet ==
The purple-winged mantis has varied diet consisting mainly of other insects, however, they have been seen eating much larger animals such as small frogs, lizards etc. Tenodera australasiae can be cannibalistic but not quite an aggressive mantis.

== Vision ==
This was one of two mantis species in which binocular stereopsis was first shown in an insect.

== Related ==
The genus Tenodera has a number of species including:

Tenodera aridifolia,
Tenodera sinensis - Chinese mantis,
Tenodera australasiae - purple-winged mantis,
Tenodera superstitiosa found in Africa.

== Additional images ==
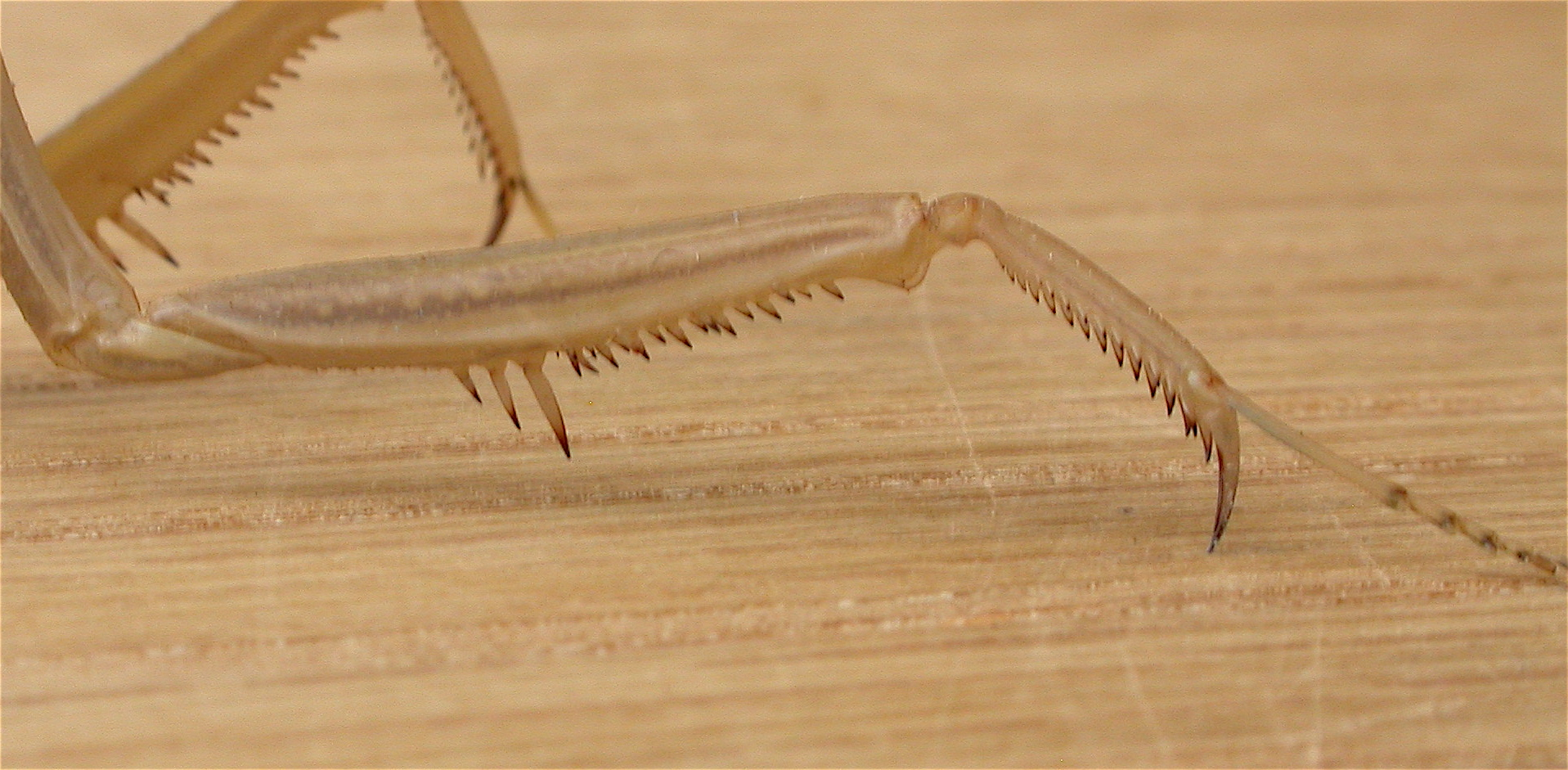
Detailed view of the arm of an adult female Tenodera australasiae

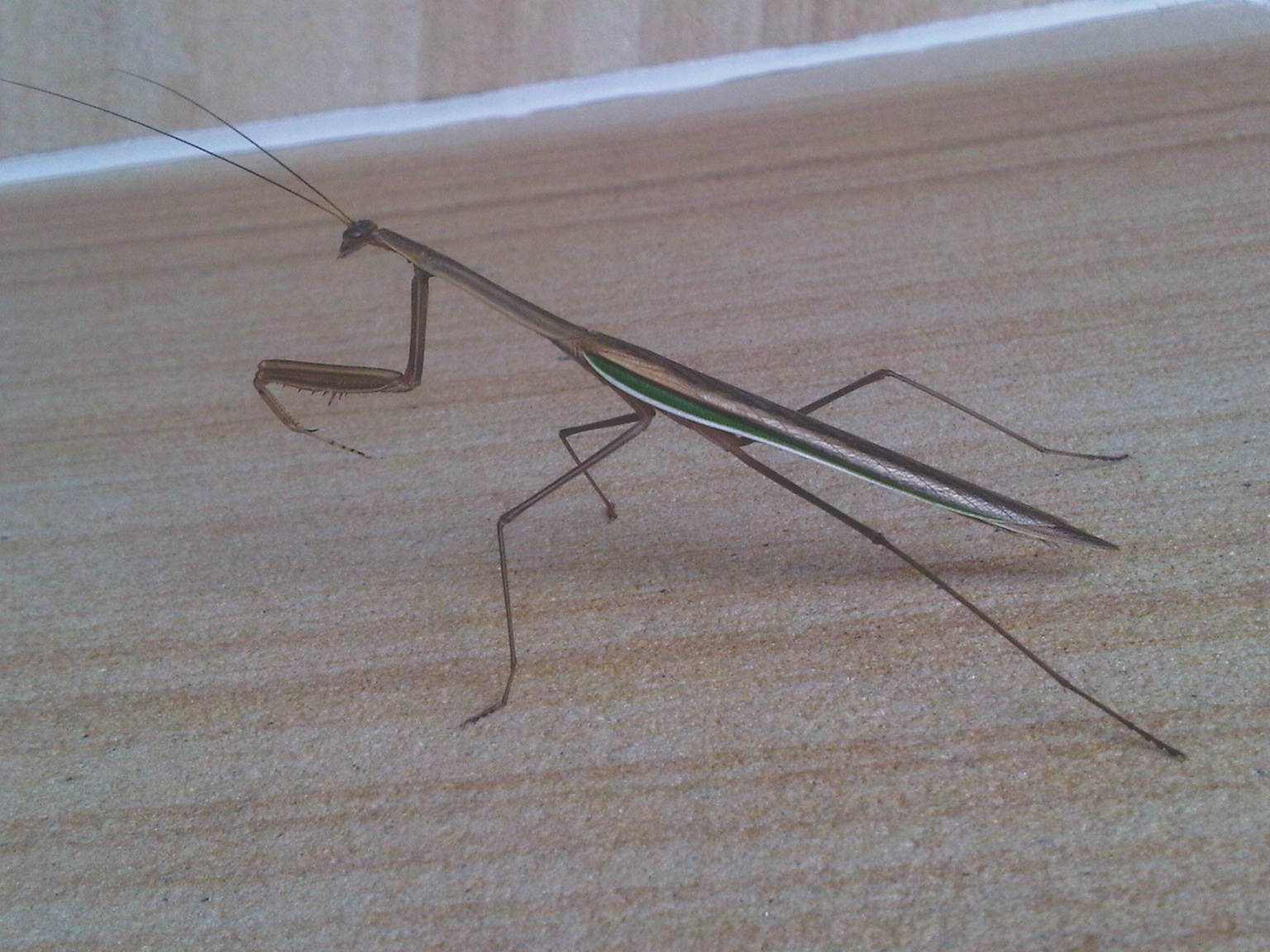
Adult male Tenodera australasiae

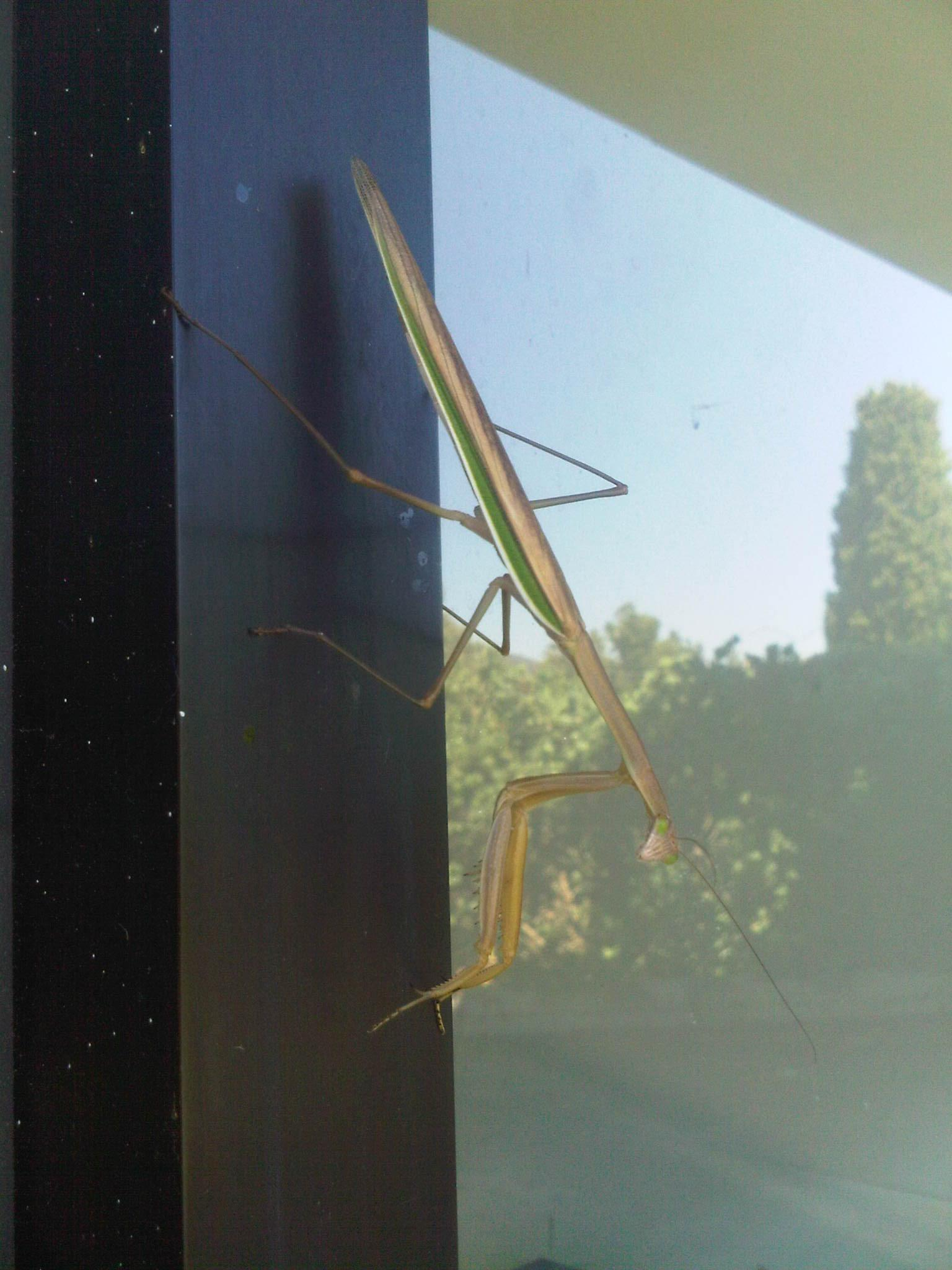
Adult Tenodera australasiae

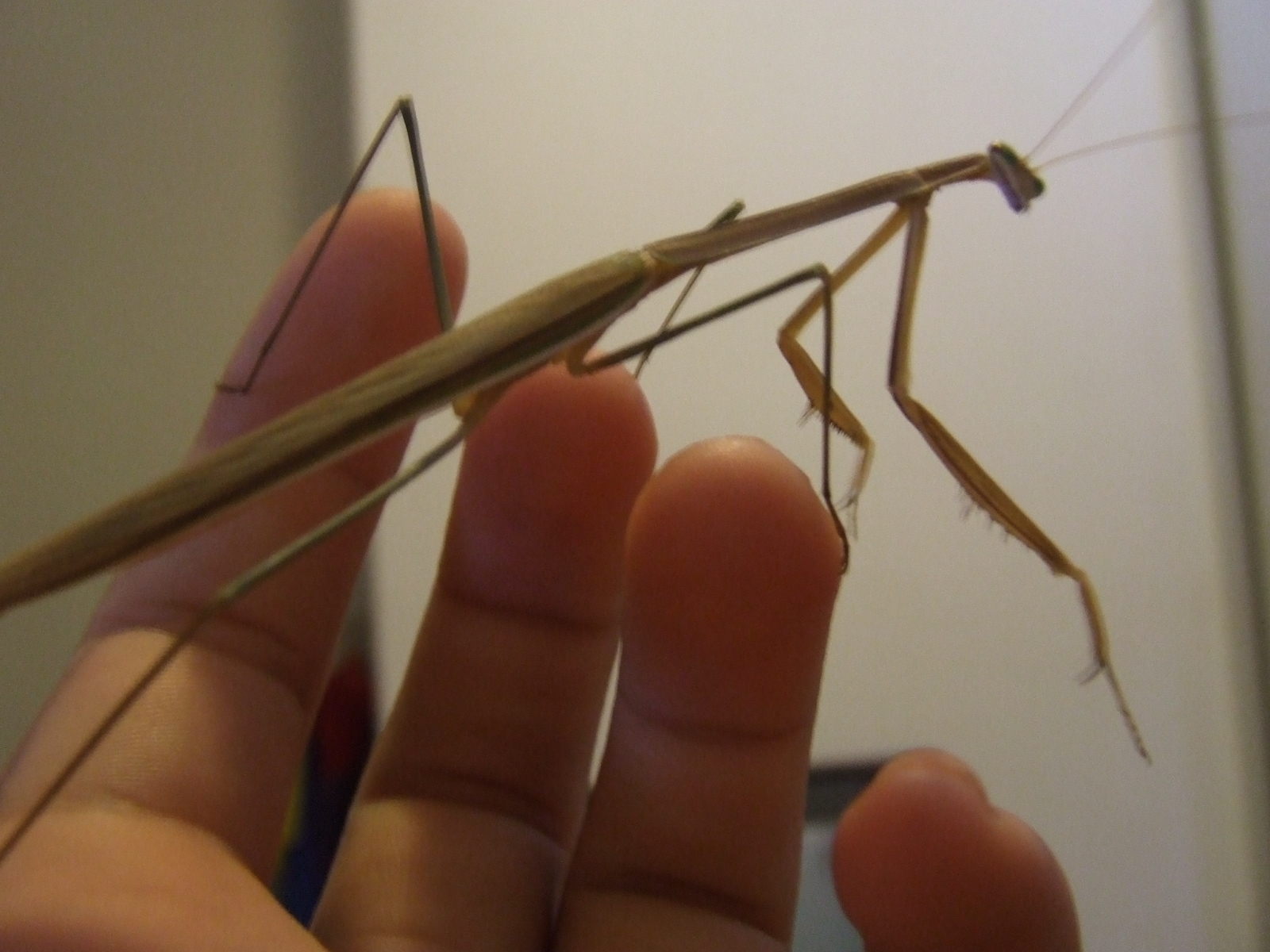
Adult female Tenodera australasiae

== See also ==
- List of Australian stick insects and mantids
- Mantises of Oceania
