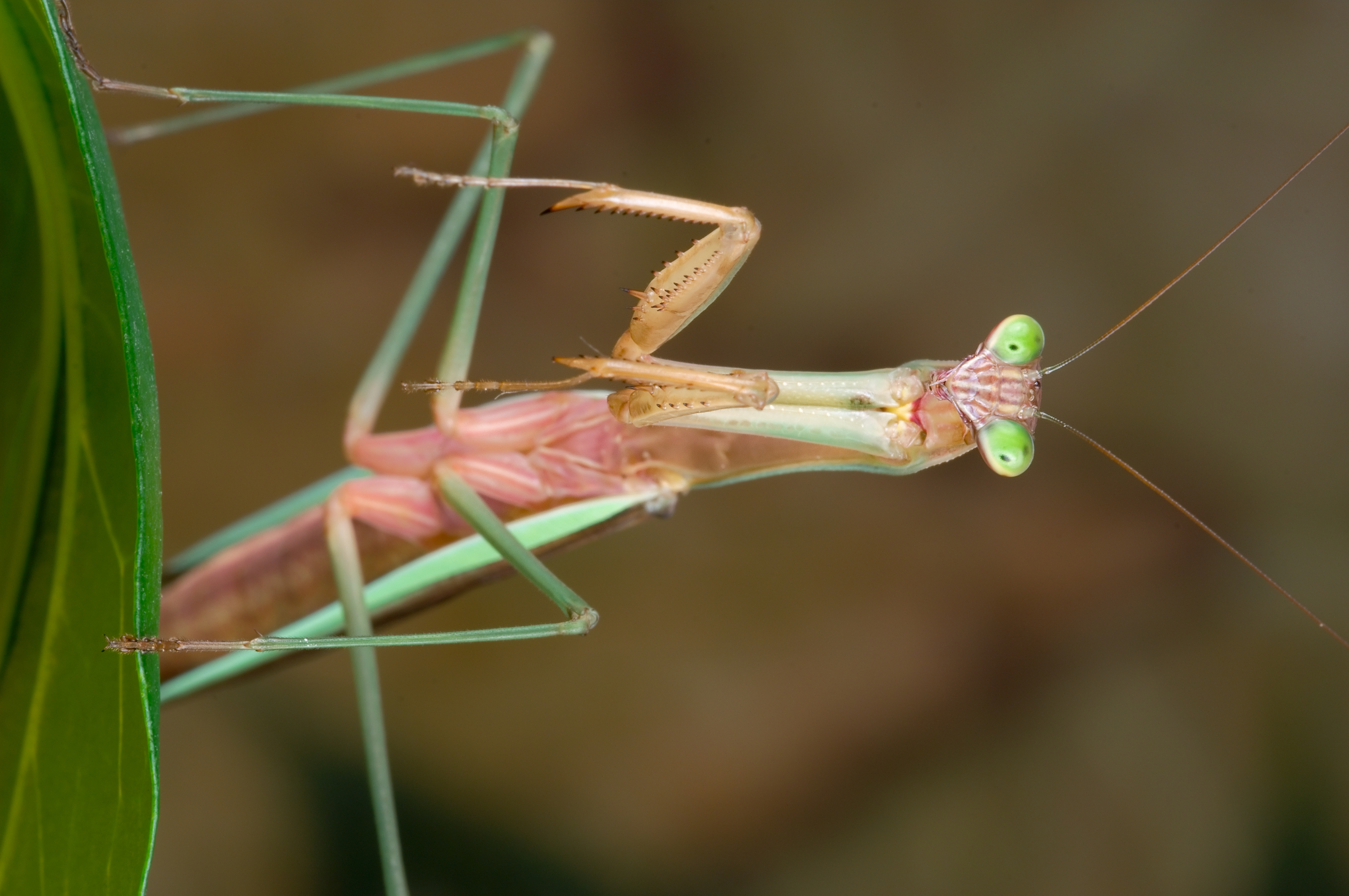
- Adult male Tenodera sinensis

Scientific classification
- Kingdom: Animalia
- Phylum: Arthropoda
- Clade: Pancrustacea
- Class: Insecta
- Order: Mantodea
- Family: Mantidae
- Tribe: Tenoderini
- Genus: Tenodera; Burmeister, 1838

Type species
- Mantis fasciata (Olivier, 1792)

Species
- See text

Synonyms
- Paratenodera (Giglio-Tos, 1912)

= Tenodera =

Genus of praying mantises

Tenodera is a genus of mantises in the family Mantidae, which contains several species of praying mantises. The species in this genus can be found primarily in Africa, Asia, and Australia, but also North America.

== Description ==
Specifically, mantids in this genus can be identified by their mid and hind femora, which contain an apical spine.

== Species ==
These species are recognised in the genus Tenodera:

1. Tenodera acuticauda (Yang, 1997)
2. Tenodera angustipennis (Saussure, 1869) (narrow-winged mantis)
3. Tenodera aridifolia (Stoll, 1813)
4. Tenodera australasiae (Leach, 1814) (purple-winged mantis)
5. Tenodera caudafissilis (Wang, 1992)
6. Tenodera chloreudeta (Burmeister, 1838)
7. Tenodera costalis (Blanchard, 1853)
8. Tenodera fasciata (Olivier, 1792)
9. Tenodera intermedia (Saussure, 1870)
10. Tenodera iringana (Giglio-Tos, 1912)
11. Tenodera parasinensis (Otte & Spearman, 2004)
12. Tenodera philippina (Beier, 1929)
13. Tenodera rungsi (Uvarov, 1935)
14. Tenodera sinensis (Saussure, 1871) (Chinese mantis)
15. Tenodera stotzneri (Werner, 1929)
16. Tenodera superstitiosa (Fabricius, 1781)

== See also ==
- List of mantis genera and species#Genus Tenodera
