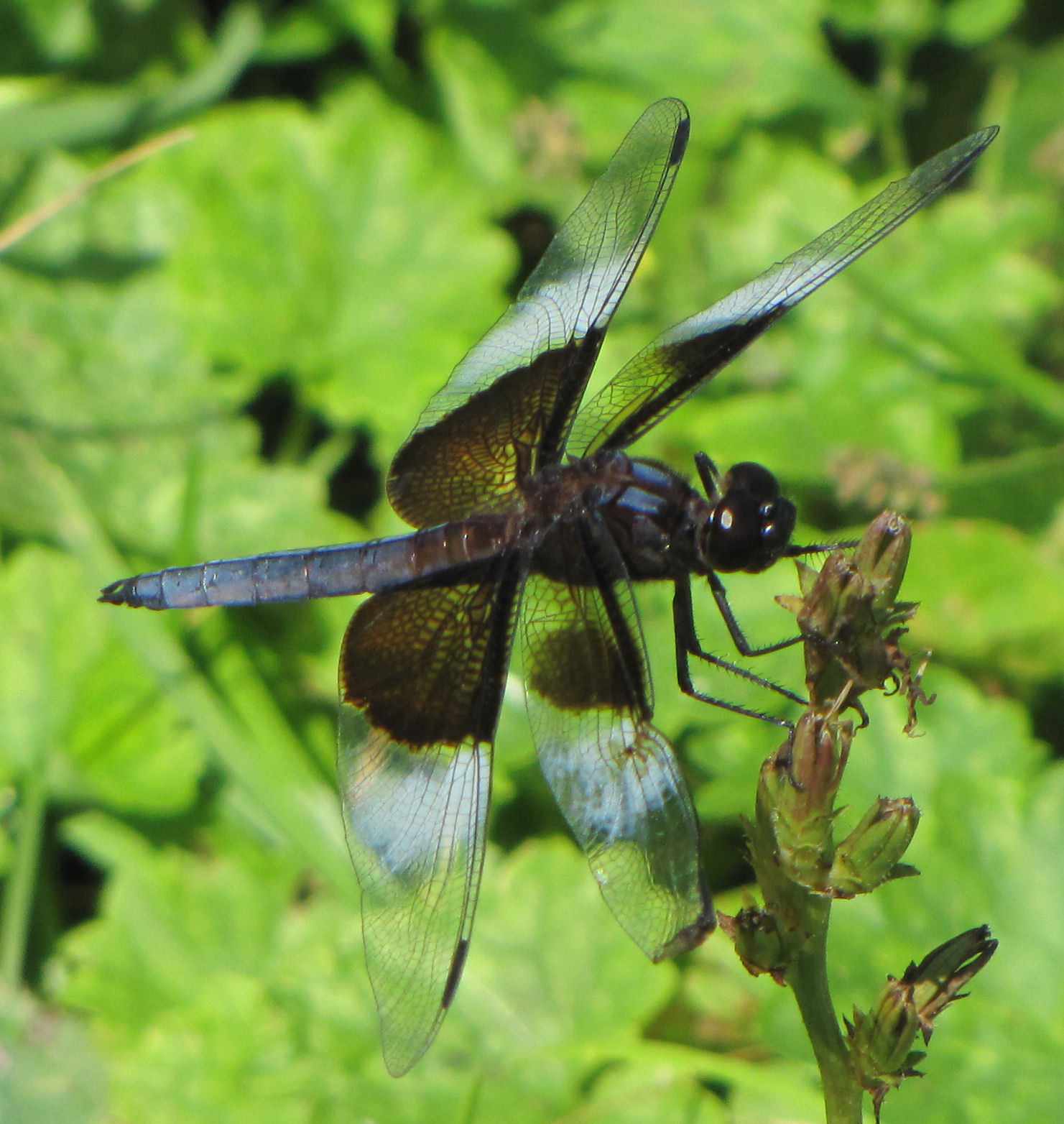
- Male
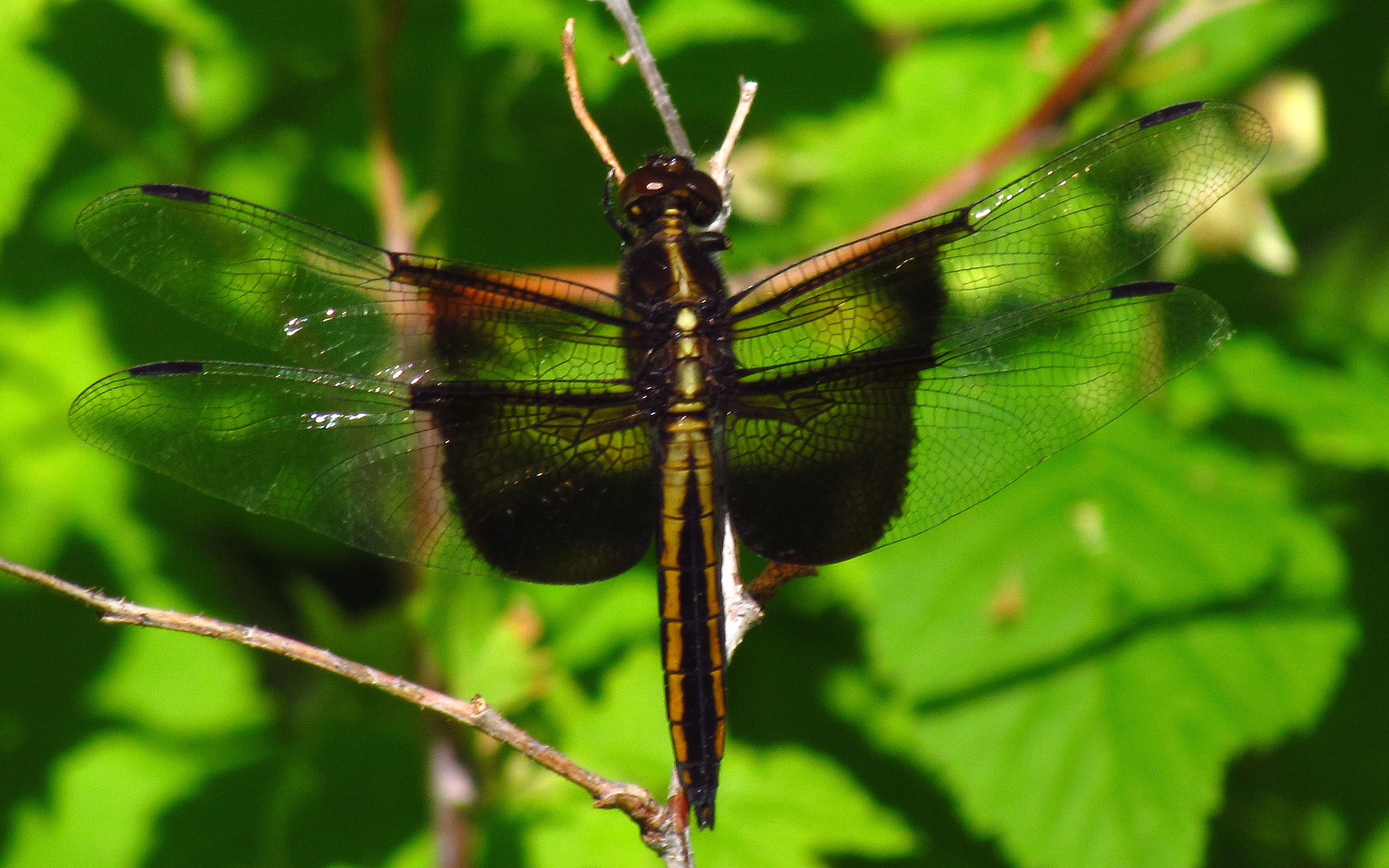
- adult female

Conservation status
- Least Concern (IUCN 3.1)

Scientific classification
- Kingdom: Animalia
- Phylum: Arthropoda
- Clade: Pancrustacea
- Class: Insecta
- Order: Odonata
- Infraorder: Anisoptera
- Superfamily: Libelluloidea
- Family: Libellulidae
- Genus: Libellula
- Species: L. luctuosa

Binomial name
- Libellula luctuosa Burmeister, 1839

= Widow skimmer =

Species of dragonfly

The widow skimmer (Libellula luctuosa) is one of the group of dragonflies known as king skimmers. The nymphs live in the water, molting and growing until they are ready to emerge from the water and then molting a final time to reveal their wings.

== Anatomy and morphology ==
Widow skimmers have large bulky bodies, with large heads. Males have a steely blue body area but females are yellow with brown stripes. Eyes are also large and close together meeting in the middle of the head. They have three pairs of legs. Legs are black in color. They have two pairs of wings: forewings and hindwings. Wings of both sexes are marked with prominent black basal bands. They keep their wings extended over their bodies. Adult males develop broad white spots at midwing as they mature. The abdomen measures 24–32 mm. They also have a slight white hue on their abdomen and thorax.

== Distribution ==
This species can be found commonly across the United States (except in the higher Rocky Mountains areas) and in southern Ontario and Quebec.

== Habitat ==
This species is found commonly in muddy substrates, or still bodies of waters such as ponds, lakes, streams, and creeks.

== Behavior ==
They are predators that prey on other insects such as mosquitoes. They catch their prey using their legs and use their fangs to bring prey into their mouth.

The process of reproduction is known as "in tandem." Position themselves to form a wheel or heart shape before sperm is transferred.

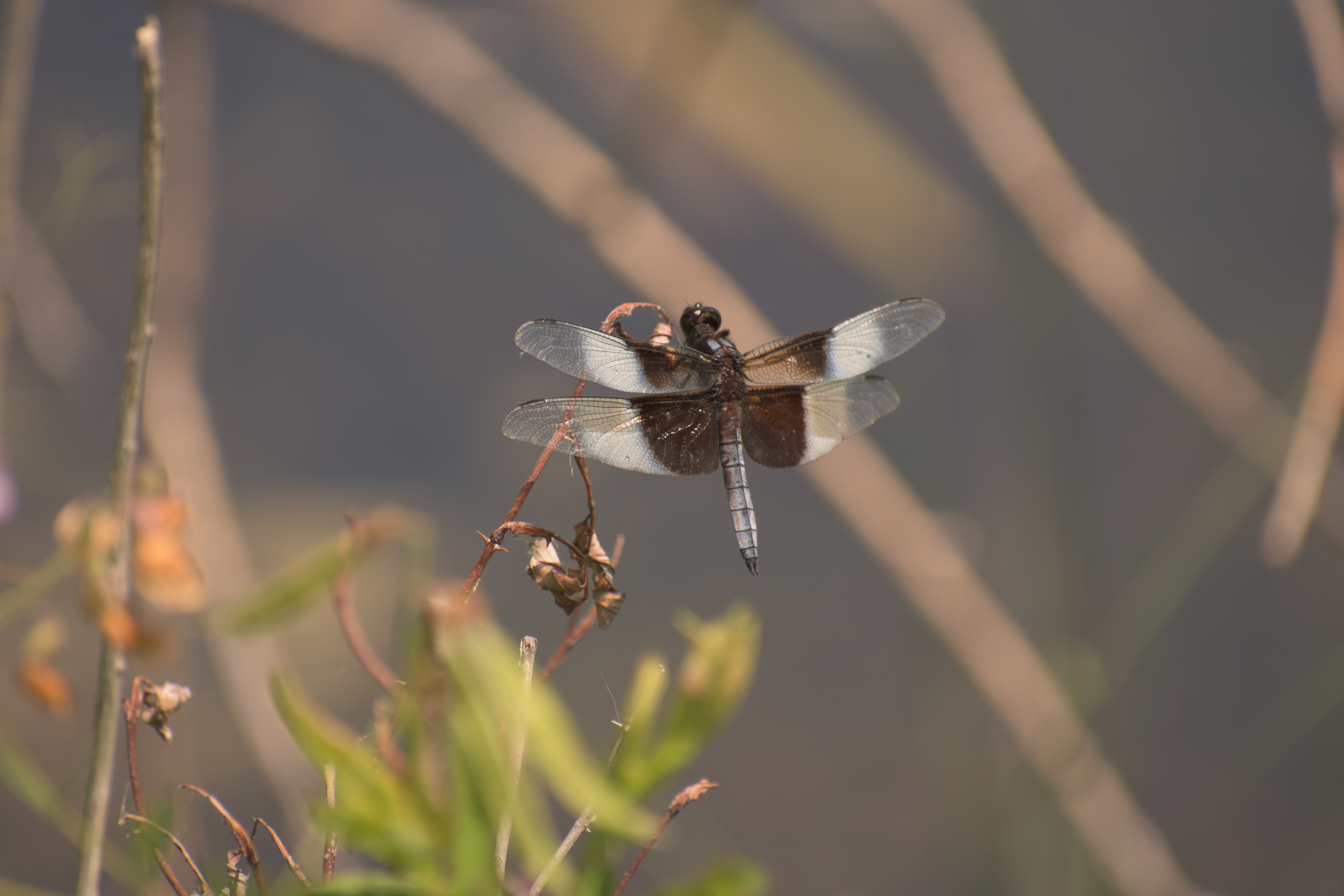
Male at Lake Ann, Michigan

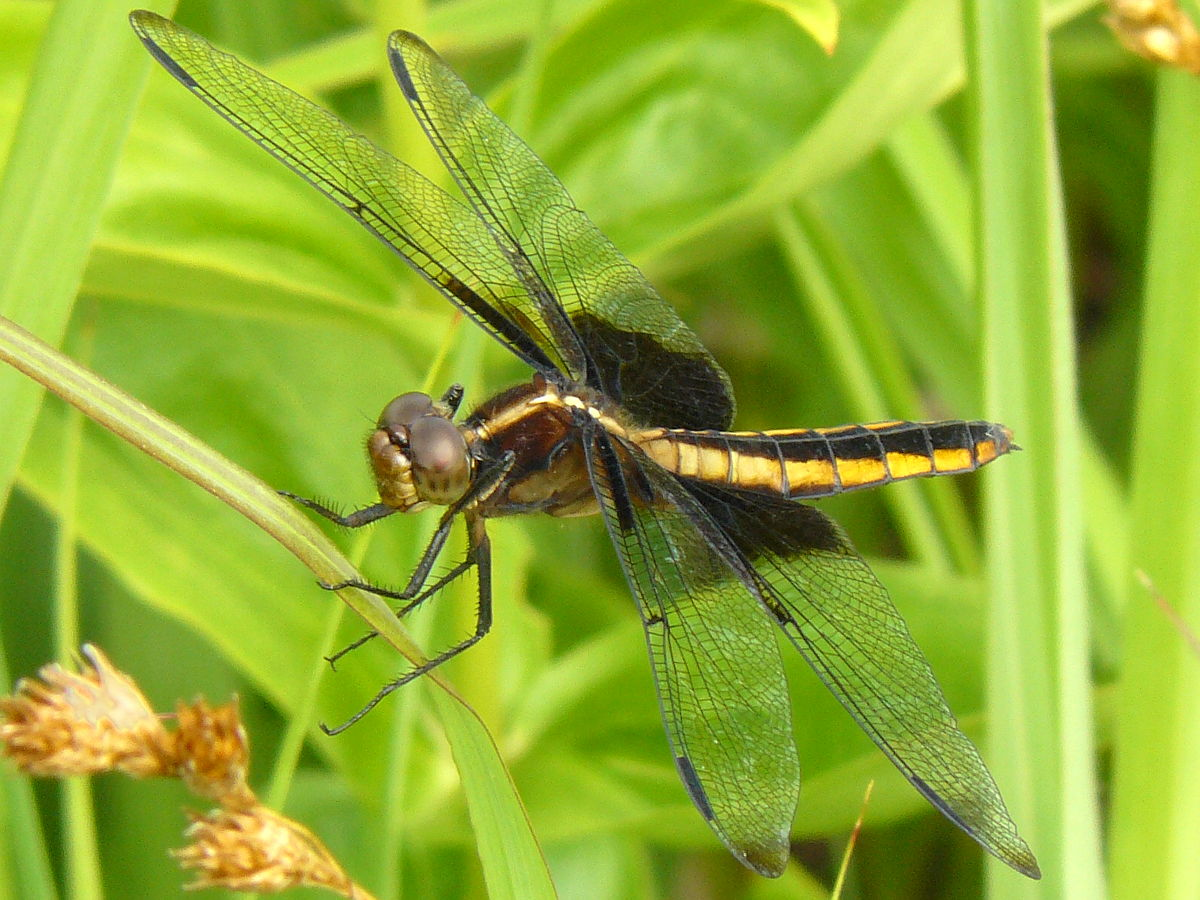
Female at Schulenberg Prairie

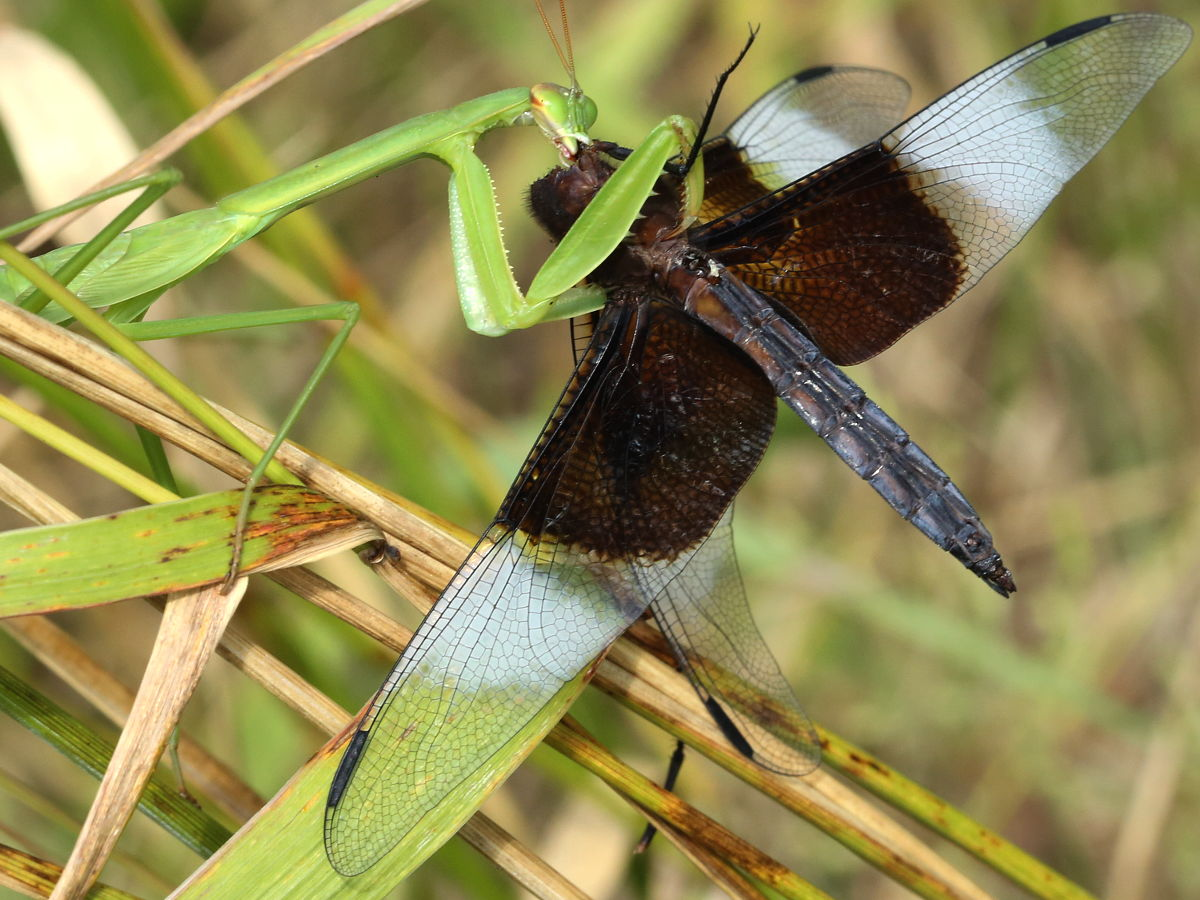
Male caught by an introduced Chinese mantis (Tenodera sinensis) in Warrenville, Illinois

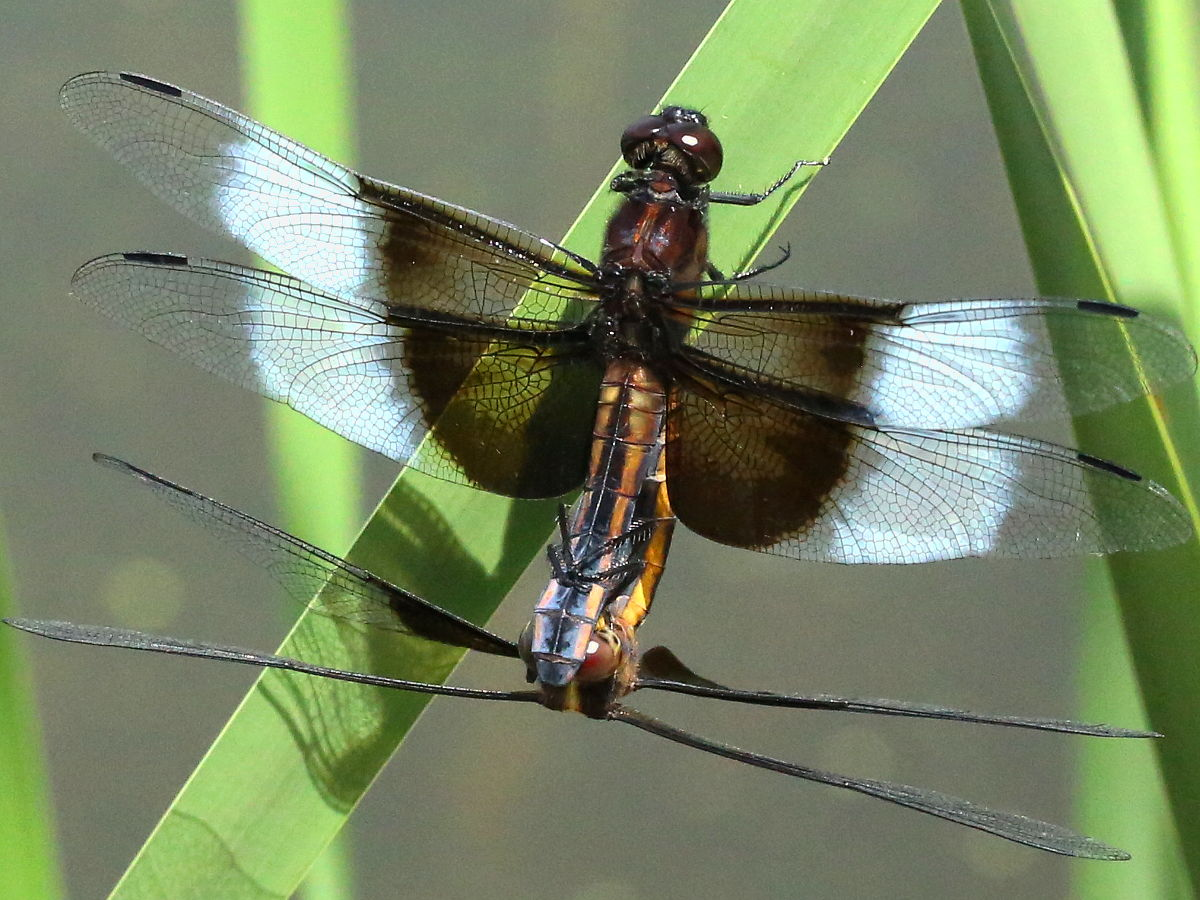
Mating wheel: female is below male. Herrick Lake Forest Preserve
