= Tenodera acuticauda =

Scientific classification
- Kingdom: Animalia
- Phylum: Arthropoda
- Clade: Pancrustacea
- Class: Insecta
- Order: Mantodea
- Family: Mantidae
- Genus: Tenodera
- Species: T. acuticauda

Binomial name
- Tenodera acuticauda (Yang, 1997)

Species of praying mantis

Tenodera acuticauda is a species of mantis in the family Mantidae.

== Range ==
China (Changshou County, Sichuan).
