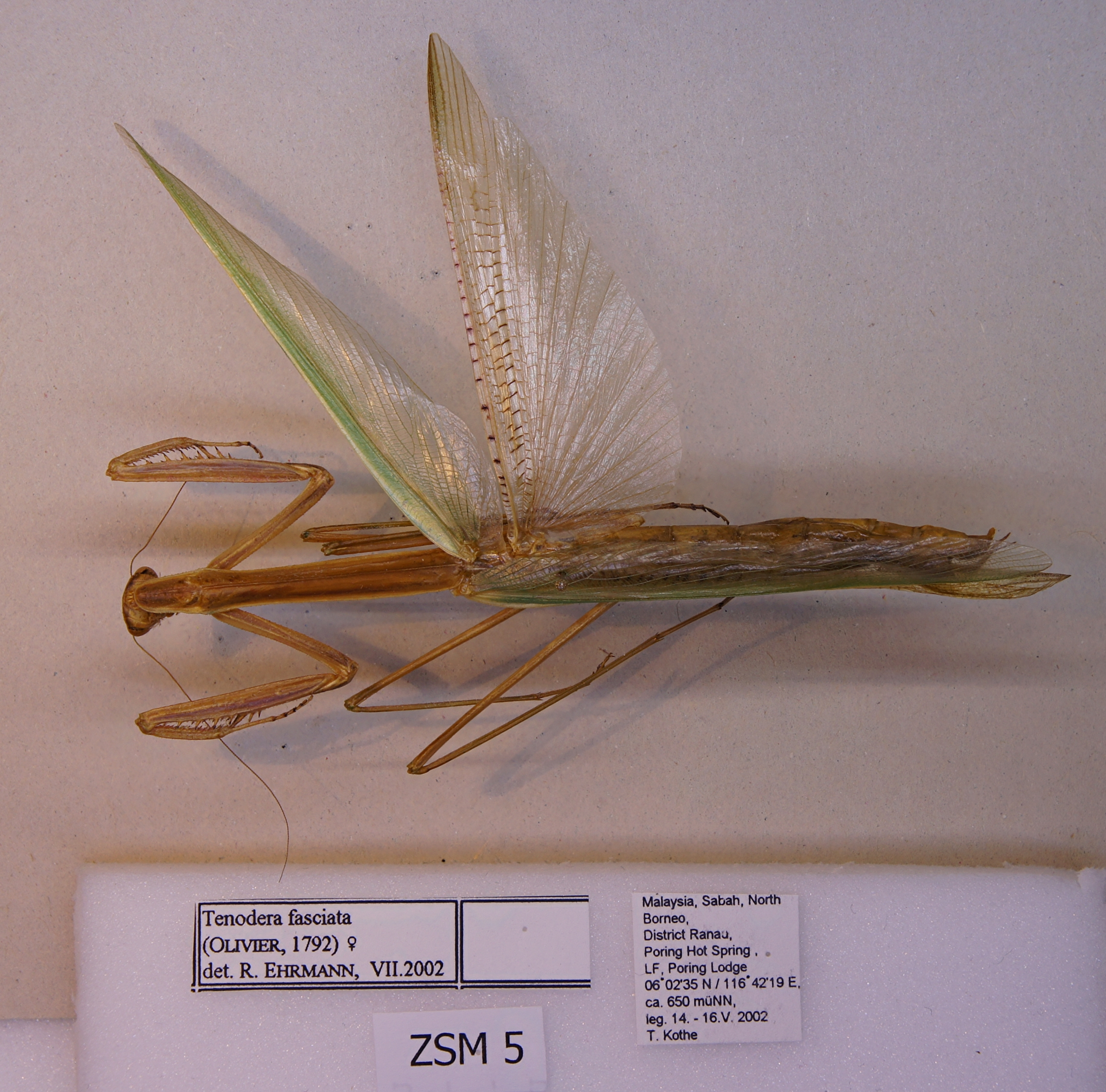

Scientific classification
- Kingdom: Animalia
- Phylum: Arthropoda
- Clade: Pancrustacea
- Class: Insecta
- Order: Mantodea
- Family: Mantidae
- Genus: Tenodera
- Species: T. fasciata

Binomial name
- Tenodera fasciata (Olivier, 1792)

= Tenodera fasciata =

Species of praying mantis

Tenodera fasciata is a species of mantis in the family Mantidae.

== Range ==
The mantis is native to Indonesia, the Philippines, and Okinawa (Ryukyu).

== Subspecies ==
There were once two subspecies of Tenodera fasciata, but Tenodera blanchardi (Giglio-Tos, 1912) was elevated to full species status by Tindale. The nominate and now sole subspecies has several synonyms:

- Tenodera fasciata attenuata (Stoll, 1813)
- Tenodera fasciata exsiccata (Serville, 1839)
- Tenodera fasciata leptelytra (Lichtenstein, 1802)
