= Tenodera parasinensis =

Scientific classification
- Domain: Eukaryota
- Kingdom: Animalia
- Phylum: Arthropoda
- Class: Insecta
- Order: Mantodea
- Family: Mantidae
- Genus: Tenodera
- Species: T. parasinensis

Binomial name
- Tenodera parasinensis (Otte & Spearman, 2004)

Species of praying mantis

Tenodera parasinensis is a species of praying mantis.
