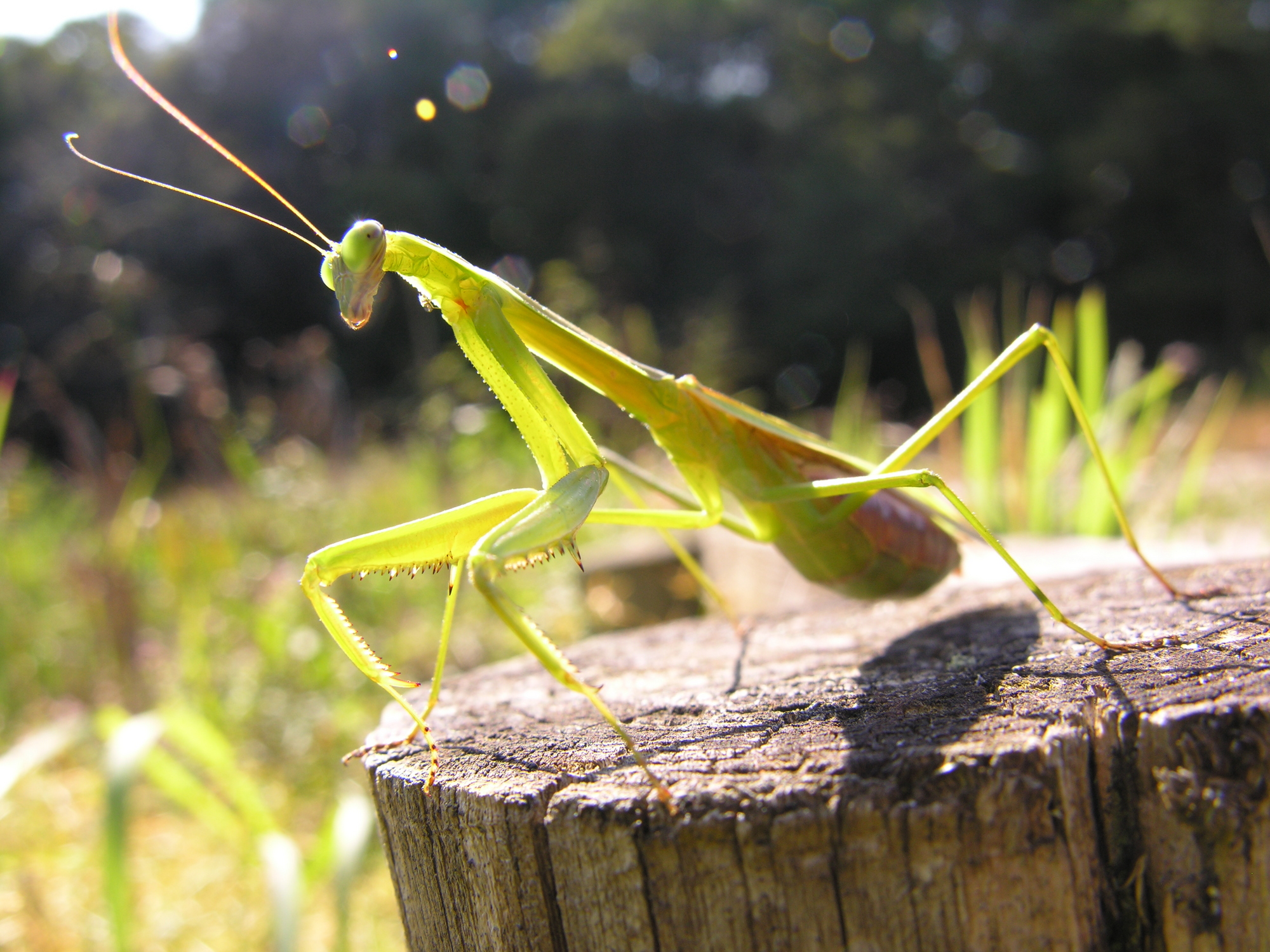
- Adult female Tenodera angustipennis

Scientific classification
- Kingdom: Animalia
- Phylum: Arthropoda
- Clade: Pancrustacea
- Class: Insecta
- Order: Mantodea
- Family: Mantidae
- Genus: Tenodera
- Species: T. angustipennis

Binomial name
- Tenodera angustipennis Saussure, 1869

Synonyms
- Paratenodera angustipennis; Tenodera aridifolia angustipennis (Saussure, 1869)?

= Tenodera angustipennis =

Species of praying mantis

Tenodera angustipennis is a species of mantis native to Asia and nearby areas of Oceania. The species was introduced and became established in the eastern United States. Tenodera angustipennis was noticed as early as 1921 in Aberdeen, Maryland, but that occurrence was not noted in a published record until 1933.

== Etymology ==
This species has two common names, narrow-winged mantis and Japanese mantis, in English. This insect is known as チョウセンカマキリ (translates to "Korean mantis") in the Japanese language and 참사마귀, (an alternative name which translates to "true mantis"), as well as just plain 사마귀 (a formal name) in the Korean language (사마귀 can mean the whole order of Mantodea or this specific species of praying mantis).

The generic name Tenodera is from Greek meaning "slender neck", and the specific name angustipennis is from Latin meaning "narrow wing".

== Description ==
=== Adults and nymphs ===
Size: Males are 65~80 mm, and females are 68~85 mm in length. T. angustipennis is often brown or green and has a more elongated pronotum and shorter, narrower tegmina and wings than Tenodera sinensis. T. angustipennis has a brown, patterned streak on each of its transparent hind wings, while T. sinensis has hind wings that are completely patterned and brown. The Chinese mantis is thicker or more stocky than the narrow-winged mantis. Distinguishing between the adults of these two species, T. angustipennis and T. sinensis, is easier when the two species are placed side by side.

=== Ootheca ===
The oothecae of Tenodera angustipennis are elongated, about 40 to 60 mm long and about 14 mm in diameter and are sometimes mistaken to be Stagmomantis carolina oothecae. T. angustipennis oothecae probably hatch around 1 to 2 weeks later than T. sinensis.

== Range ==
This species occurs in China, Hawaii, India, Java, Korean Peninsula, Ulleung-do, Jejudo, Taiwan, Vietnam, Honshu, Shikoku, Kyushu, Tsushima Island, and Okinawa Island.
Its non-native range in the United States include: Delaware, Maryland,New York, North Carolina, New Jersey, Ohio, Pennsylvania, and Virginia.

== Habitat ==
The oothecae are often laid on twigs of shrubs or stems of tall herbs, but in field margins, tree trunks and fence posts seemingly are preferred. In some areas T. angustipennis is just as common as T. sinensis.

== Additional images ==
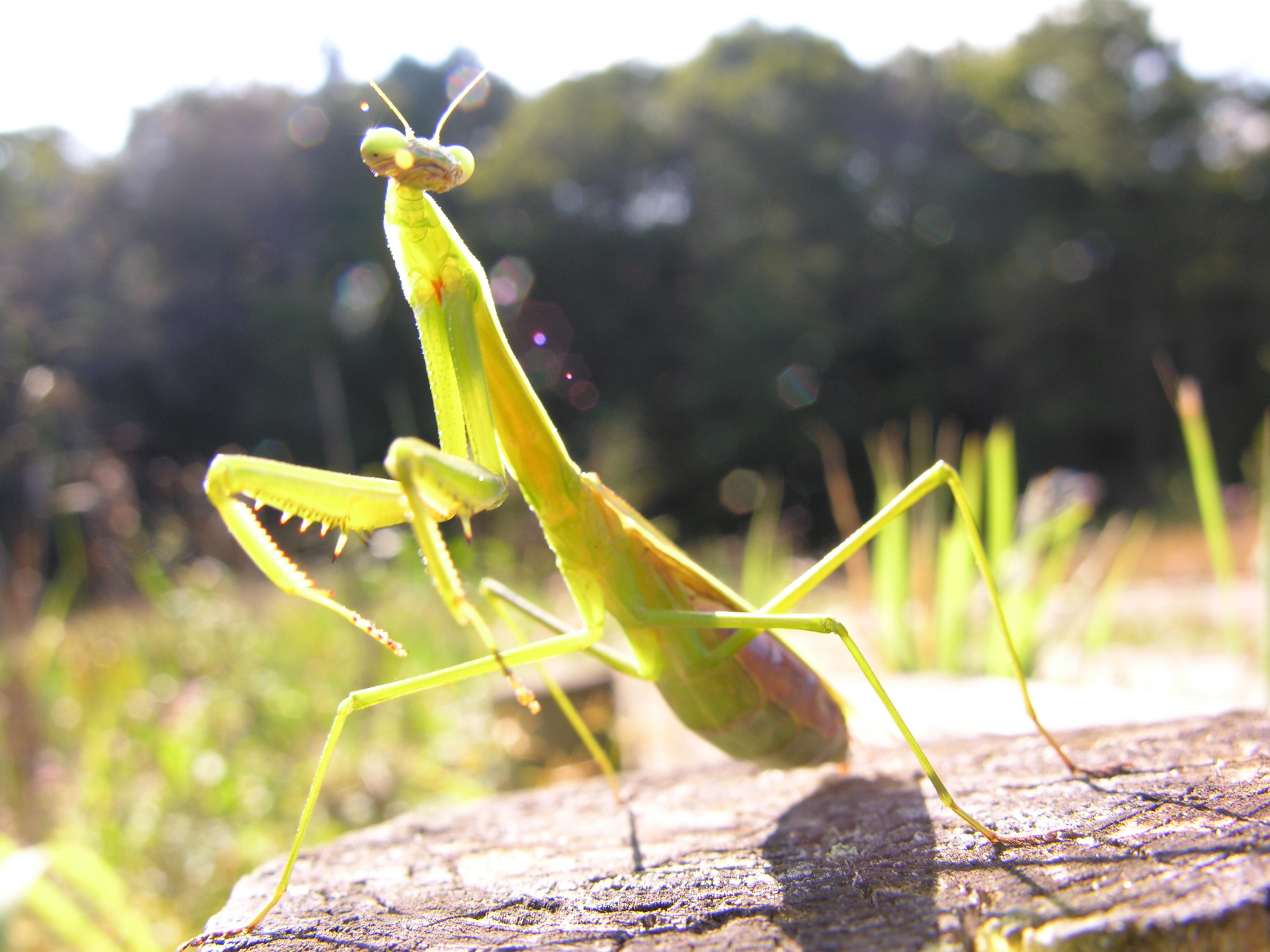
Adult female Tenodera angustipennis

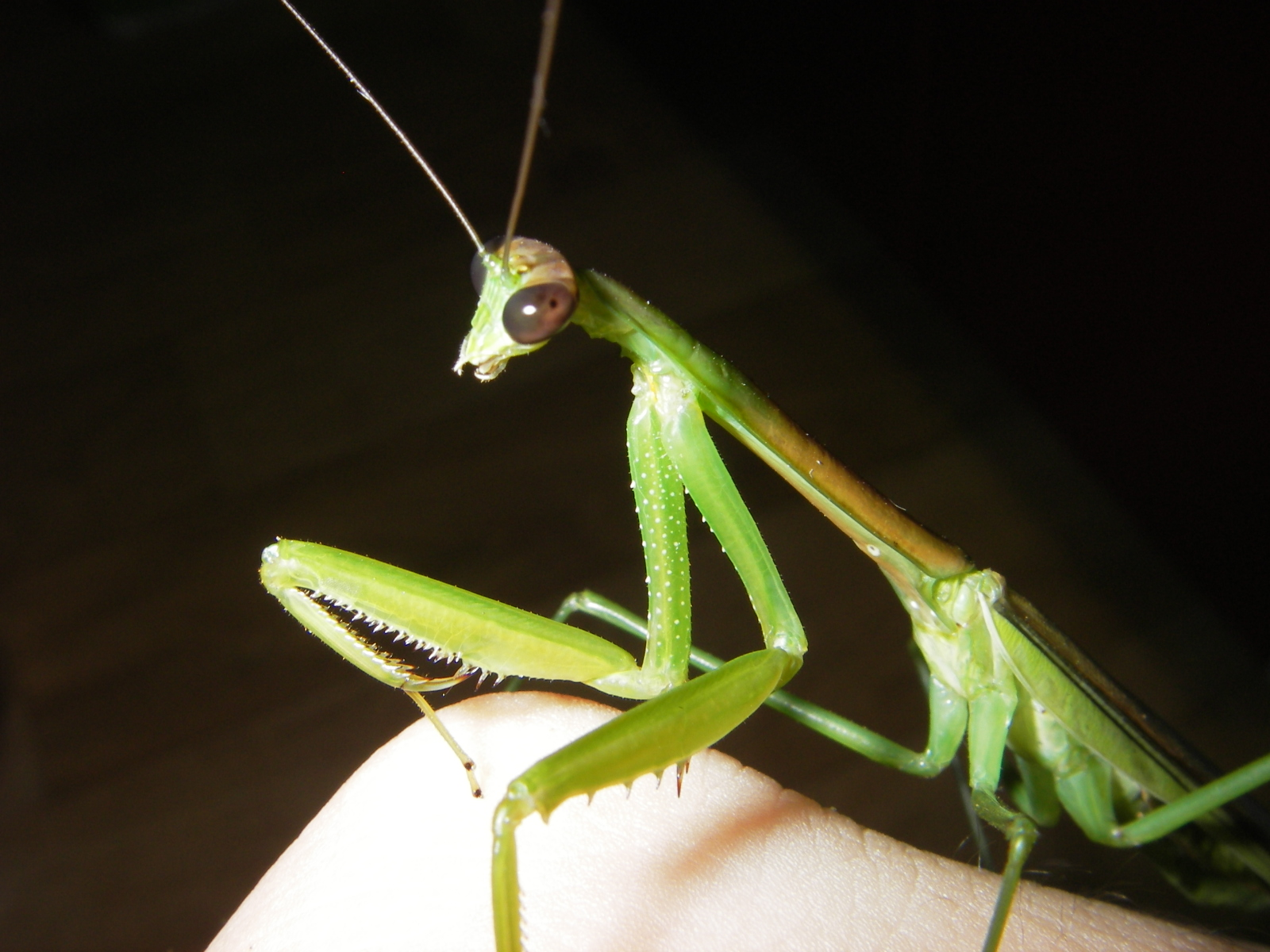
Adult male T. angustipennis

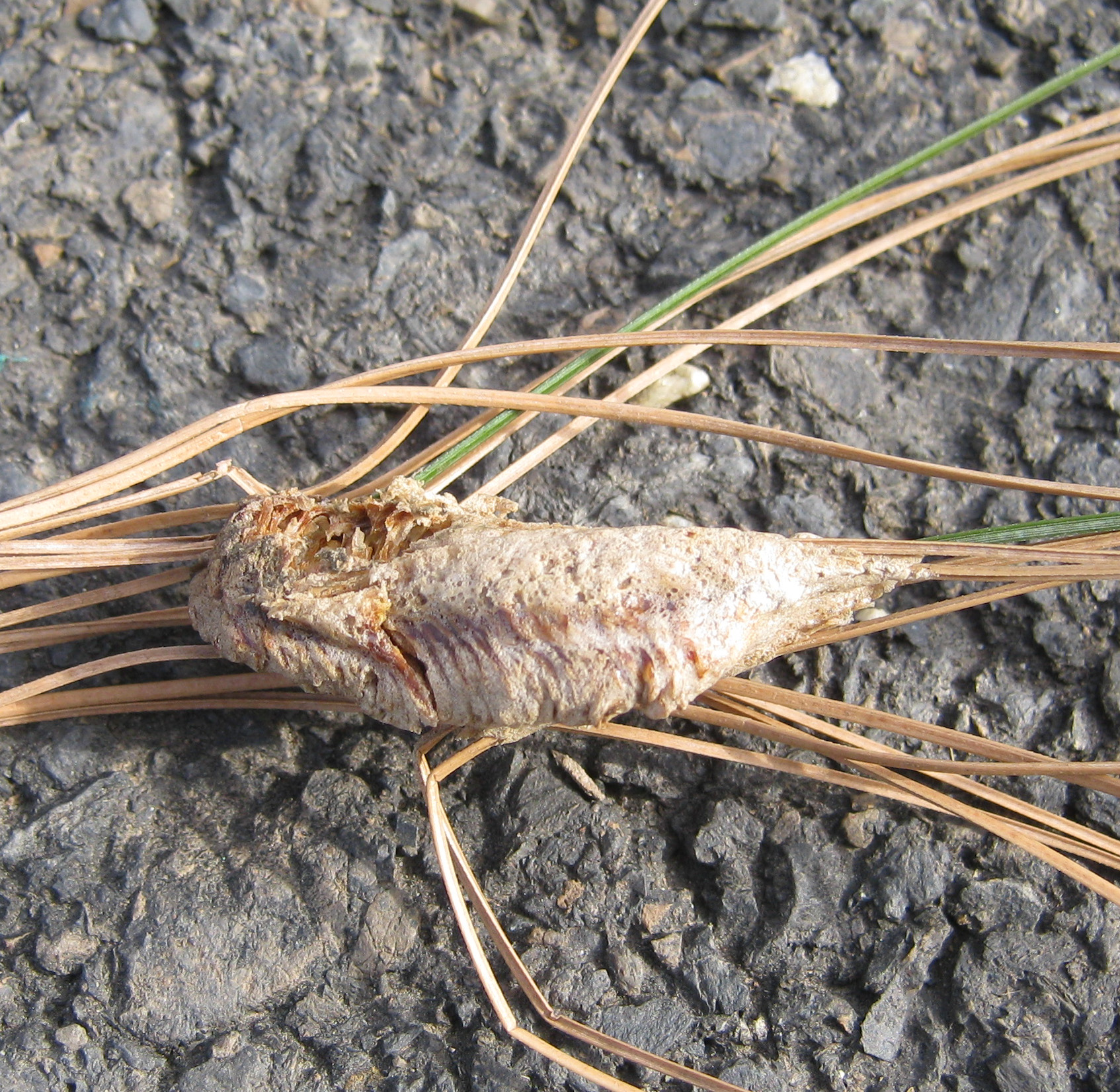
Egg case

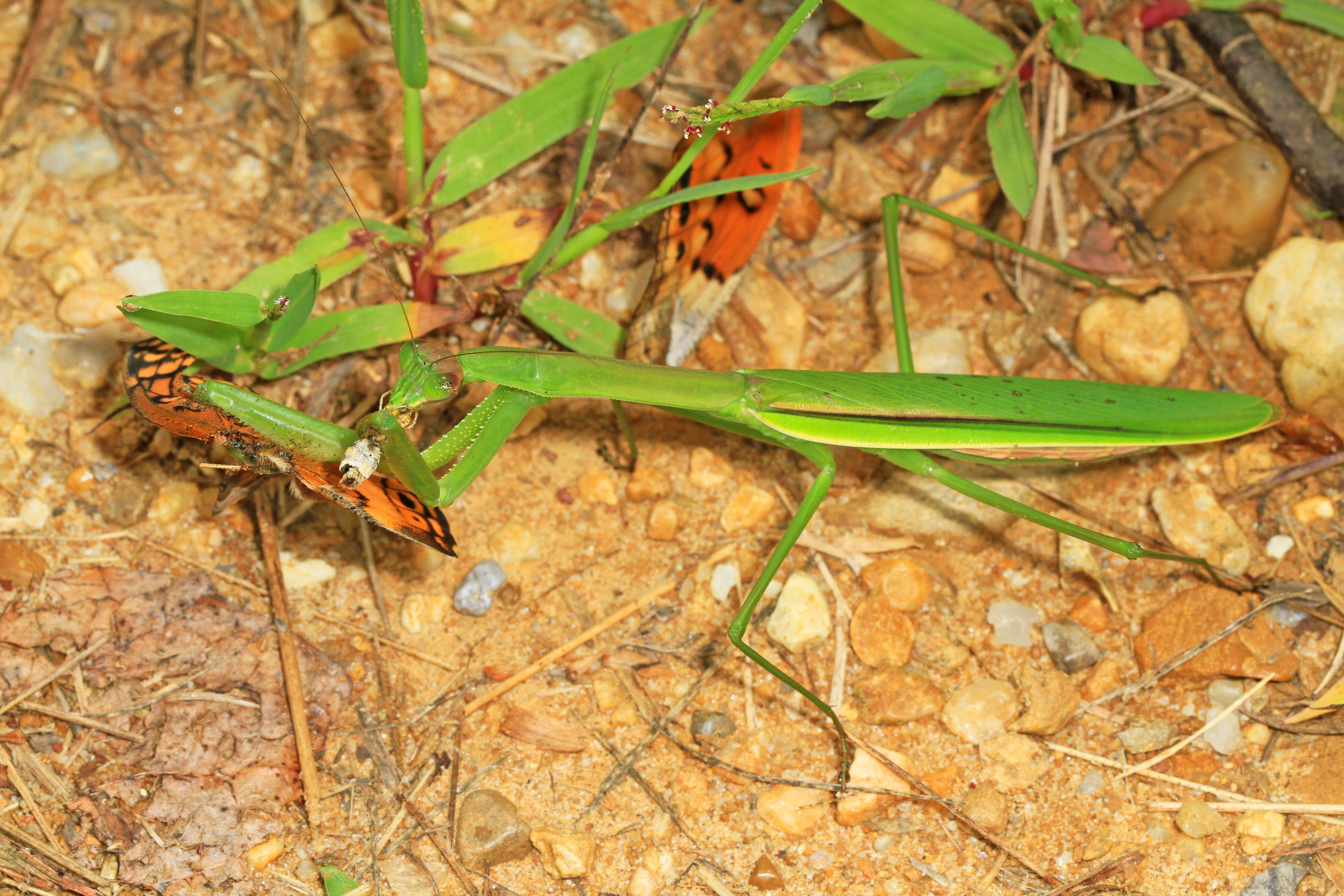
A female T. angustipennis eating a variegated fritillary (note: the mantis is misidentified as T. sinensis)

== See also ==
- List of mantis genera and species

== Bibliography ==
- 김정환 (1998). 한국의 잠자리, 메뚜기, 사마귀, 대벌레/THE ODONATA and ORTHOPTERA, ETC. OF KOREA IN COLOR. KYOHAK PUBLISHING CO., LTD. SEOUL, KOREA. p. 431.
