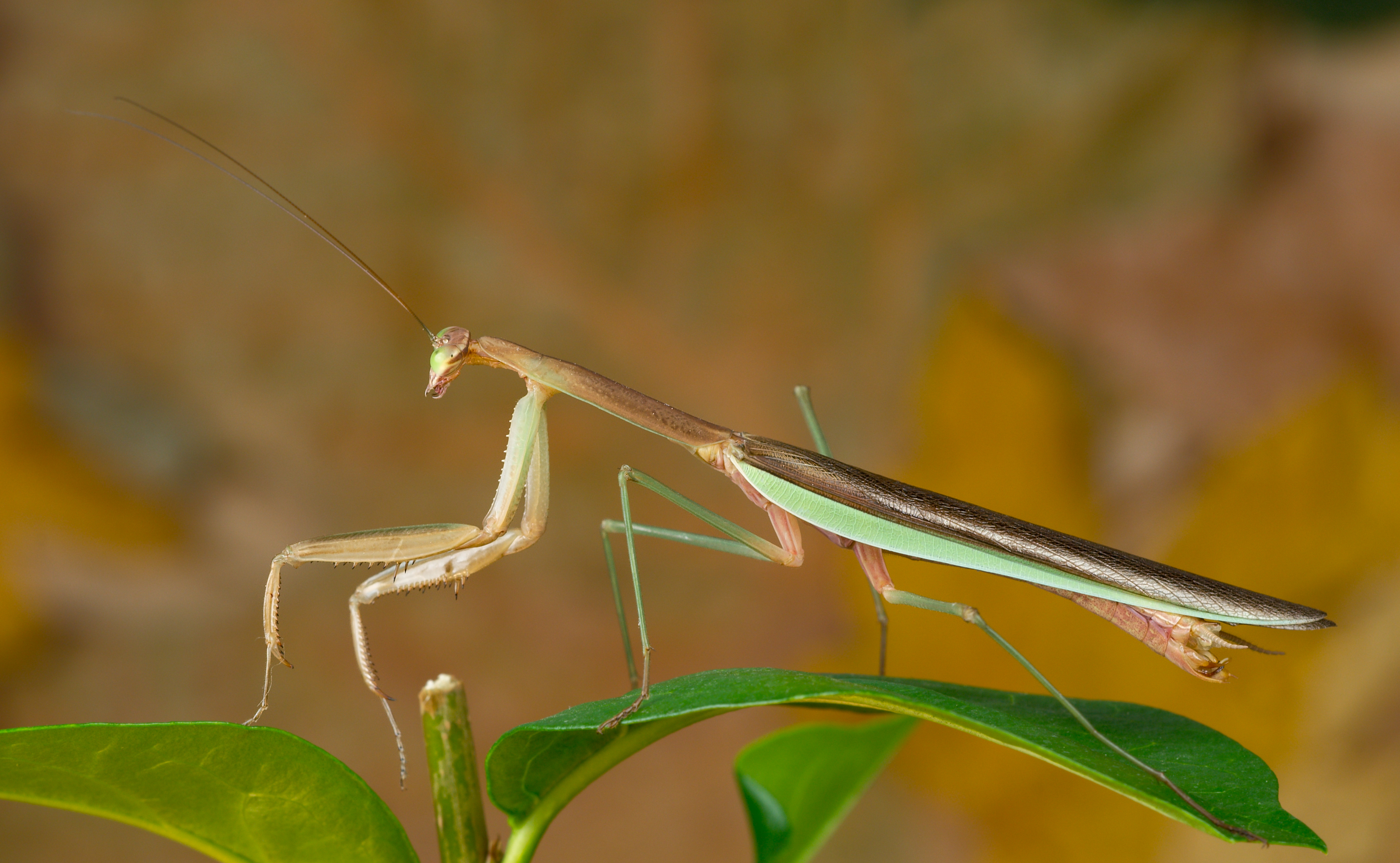
- Adult male

Scientific classification
- Kingdom: Animalia
- Phylum: Arthropoda
- Clade: Pancrustacea
- Class: Insecta
- Order: Mantodea
- Family: Mantidae
- Subfamily: Tenoderinae
- Tribe: Tenoderini
- Genus: Tenodera
- Species: T. sinensis

Binomial name
- Tenodera sinensis (Saussure, 1871)

Synonyms
- Tenodera aridifolia sinensis (Saussure, 1871); Mantis mandarinea (Saussure, 1871); Paratenodera sinensis (Saussure, 1871)

= Chinese mantis =

Species of praying mantis

The Chinese mantis (Tenodera sinensis), is a species of mantis native to temperate Asia and the nearby islands. In 1896, this species was accidentally introduced by a nursery tender at Mt. Airy, a neighborhood of Philadelphia, United States. T. sinensis often is erroneously referred to as Tenodera aridifolia sinensis because it was at first described as a subspecies of Tenodera aridifolia, but T. sinensis is now established as a full species.

T. sinensis feeds primarily on other large insects, though adult females sometimes catch small vertebrates. For example, they have been observed feeding on hornets, spiders, grasshoppers, katydids, small reptiles, amphibians, and even hummingbirds. Like most mantids, they are known to be cannibalistic. One study found that cannibalism occurs in up to 50% of matings. These mantids have been observed eating the larvae of monarch butterflies, while discarding the entrails.

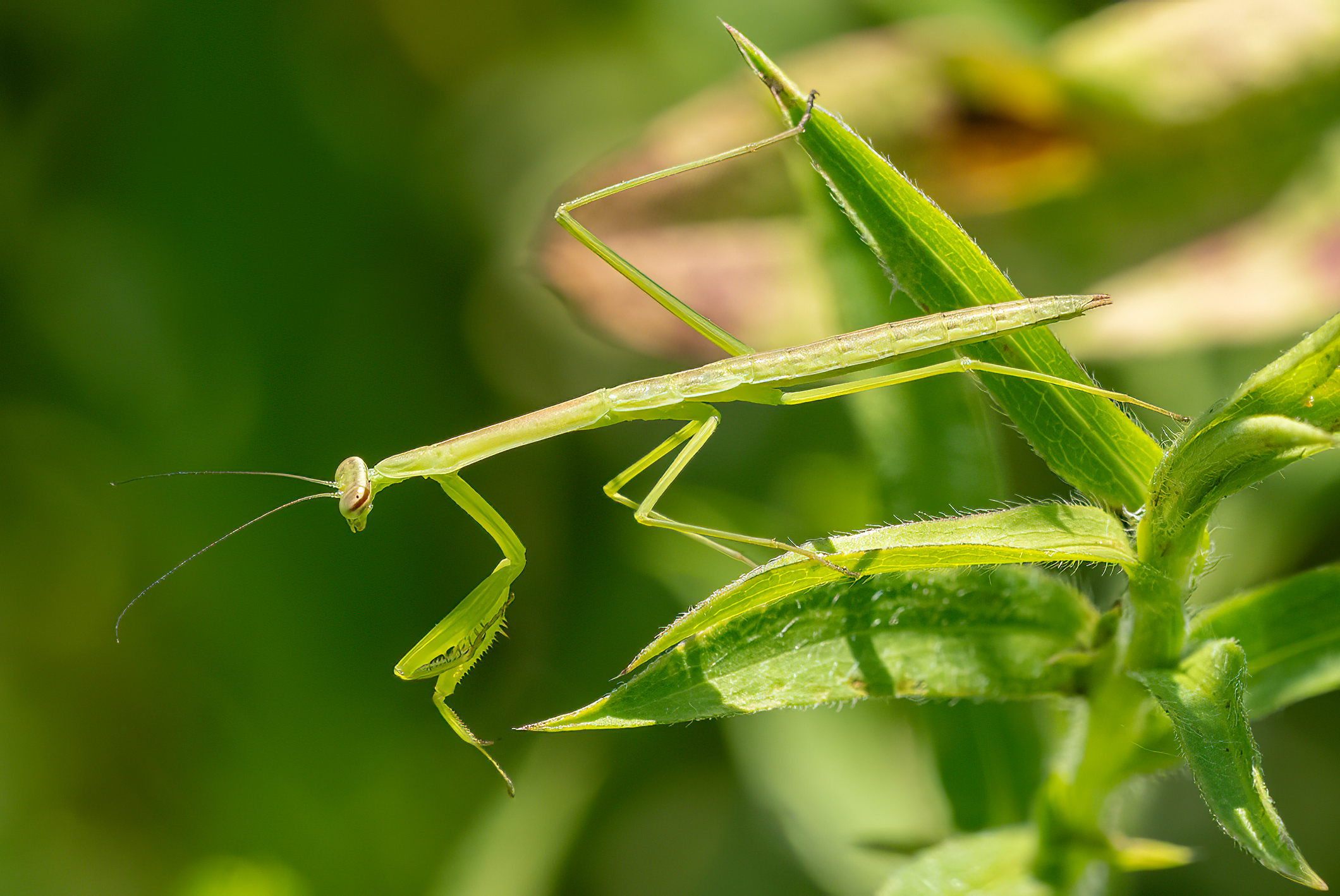
Nymph in New York

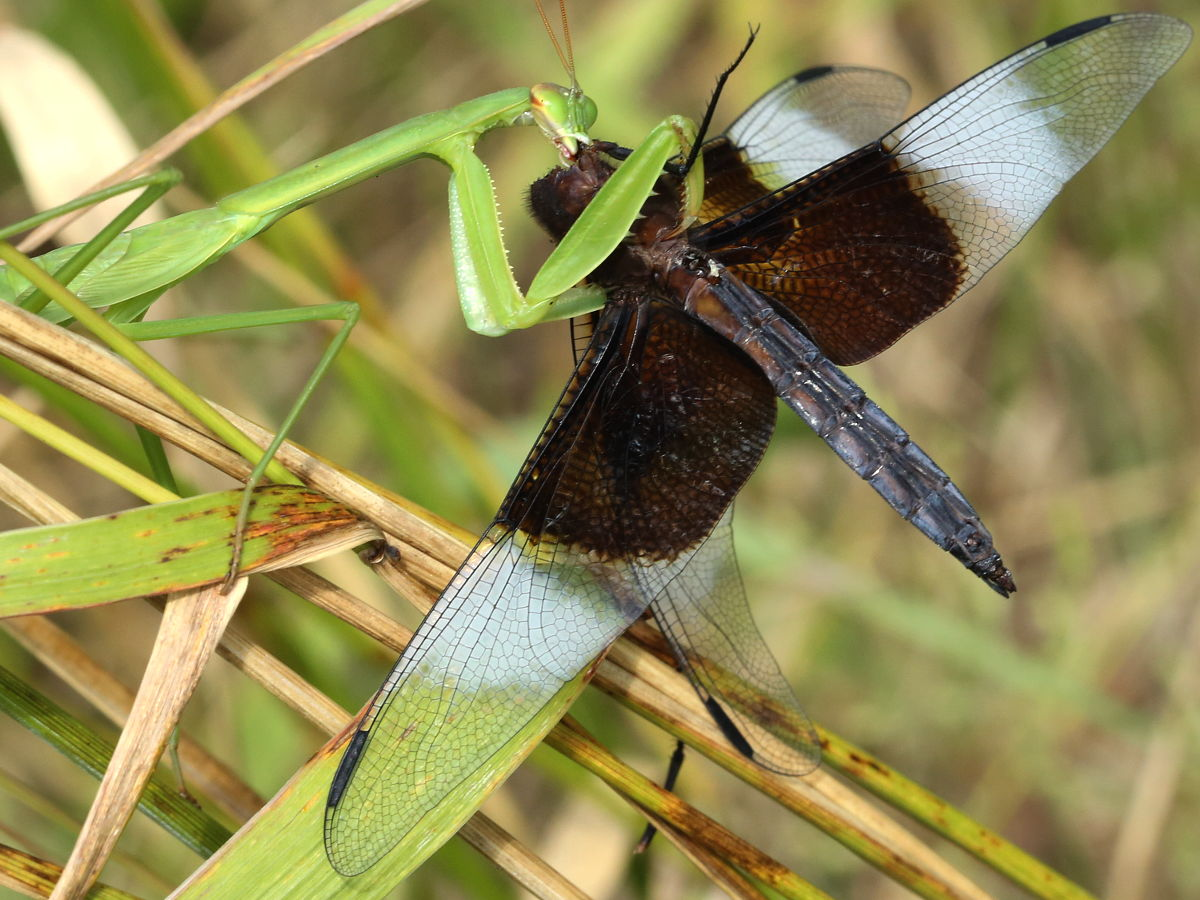
Eating a widow skimmer in Warrenville, Illinois

A Chinese mantis catches a differential grasshopper

== Description ==
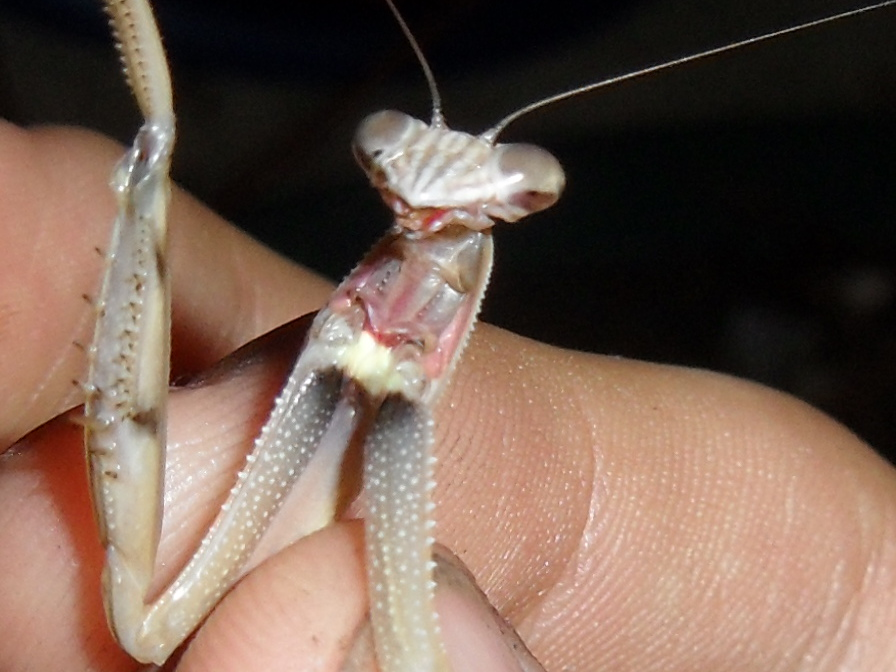
Brown subadult female Chinese mantis: The spot between the legs is yellow, compared with the orange of Tenodera angustipennis.

The Chinese mantis is a long, slender, brown and green praying mantis. It is typically longer than other praying mantis species, reaching just over 11 cm (4.3 in), and is the largest mantis species in North America (spread throughout the Northeast United States). Its color can vary from overall green to brown with a green lateral stripe on the borders of the front wings in the brown color form. In low light, the eyes of the mantis appear black, but in daylight appear to be clear, matching the color of the head. Chinese mantids look similar to another mantis species that has been introduced to the United States, the narrow-winged mantid (Tenodera angustipennis). T. sinensis and T. angustipennis are similar in appearance, but distinguishing them is possible by locating a spot in between their front legs, as the spot is yellow in the Chinese mantis but orange in the narrow-winged mantis. The female can produce several semispherical oothecae, roughly 2 cm (0.8 in) in diameter, containing up to 300 eggs. The oothecae are often affixed to vegetation such as bushes and small trees.

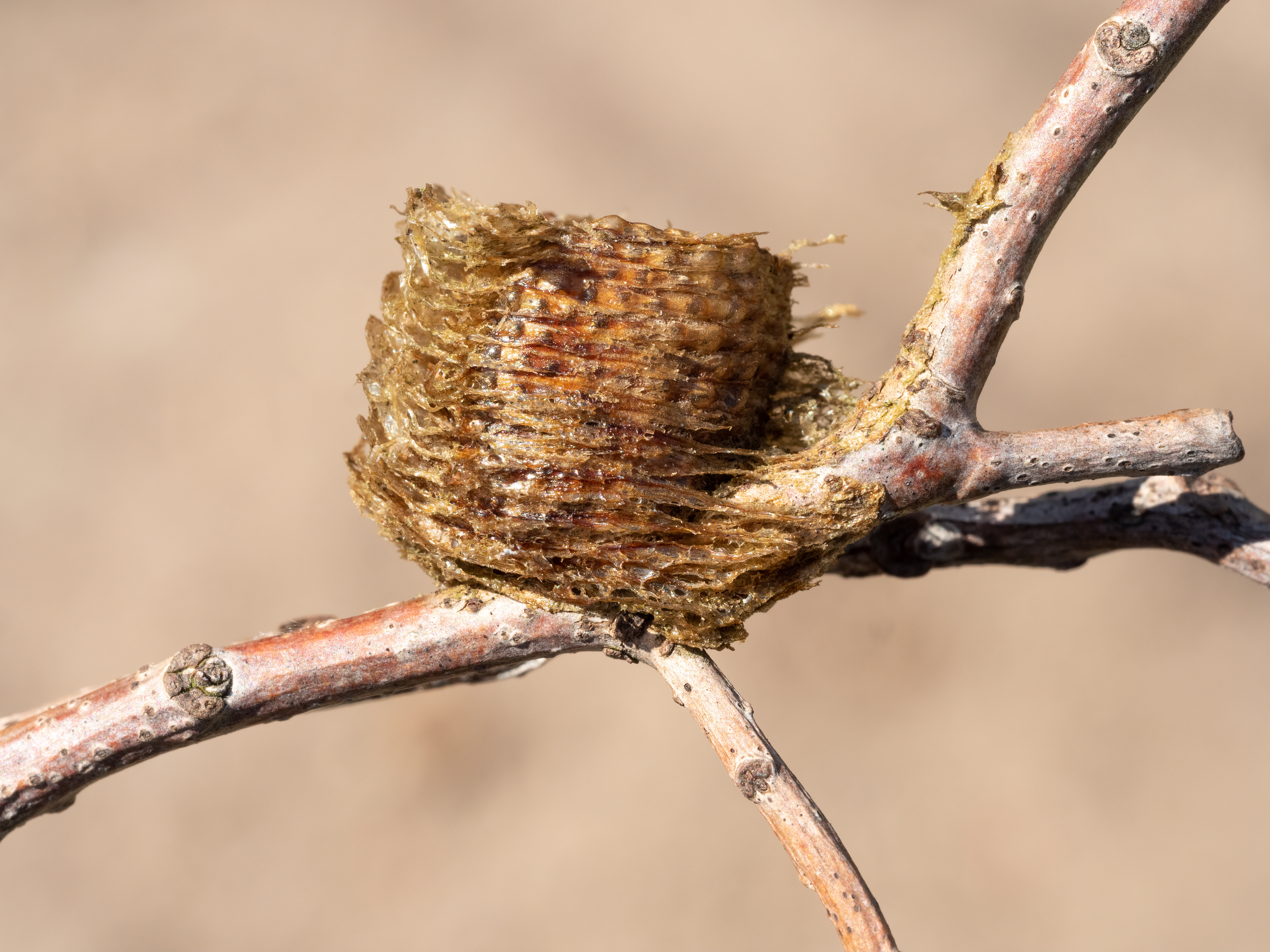
T. sinensis ootheca

== Native range ==
This mantis is native to China, Japan, southern Primorsky Krai in Russia, and the Korean Peninsula. T. sinensis in Japan, where it is known as Ōkamakiri (オオカマキリ), is frequently misclassified as Tenodera aridifolia, of which T. sinensis was originally considered a subspecies, until it was elevated to species rank in 2002.

=== Invasive status ===
The Chinese mantis is regarded by some experts as invasive in various regions of the United States, particularly where the native Carolina mantis (Stagmomantis carolina) is found. While commonly sold for pest control, Chinese mantids are said to lack effectiveness in pest management. As ambush predators, they attack anything within reach that they can subdue, but they do not actively hunt for insect pests. Their nonselective predatory behavior and significant size have led to documented attacks on beneficial insects such as pollinators, small birds, mammals, frogs, and snakes. As a result, the Chinese mantis can alter food webs and affect the dynamics of local insect populations. However, it is largely restricted to early-succession habitats and manmade old fields, which makes its impact rather negligible compared to more destructive invasive species.

It is absent from much of the coastal Deep South and in Florida, where the winters aren’t cold enough to keep their eggs in diapause, as well as in much of the western United States, where it is generally too dry or not dry enough for them to establish.

== Growth ==
Chinese mantises hatch in the spring, eat, grow, and molt through the summer, and lay eggs at the end of summer. When the weather gets too cold, they die, only living around a year long. First-instar nymphs that eat less take a longer time to molt to the next instar and are smaller at the second instar than first-instar nymphs that have been fed more.

== Captivity ==
T. sinensis is a common pet for mantis enthusiasts, and oothecae can be purchased from plant nurseries across the US and Canada.

== Predators ==
The Chinese mantis is preyed on by other mantises, birds, and the Asian giant hornet in its native range. The nymphs are preyed on by a greater variety of insects, many of which are later frequently preyed on by the adults. The female mantis specifically preys on male mantises. She often kills and eats her male partner after mating, providing nutrition for her offspring. Sexual cannibalism is a strange phenomenon not yet completely understood by scientists.

== Similar species ==
The European mantis (Mantis religiosa) and the Carolina mantis (Stagmomantis carolina) are both smaller mantises closely resembling the Chinese mantis. The European mantis varies from tan to green in color and is about 7.5 cm (3 in) long. The Carolina mantis, though, is only 6 cm (2.5 in) in length and varies more in color.

== Culture ==
Two martial arts styles have been created to mimic the movements of the Chinese mantis. Developed in the Shandong province of China in the mid-17th century, Praying Mantis kung-fu is based on the quick movements and techniques of the Chinese mantis. An unrelated style of kung fu that was developed by the Hakka people in Southern China is known as Southern Praying Mantis.

Master Mantis, one of the supporting characters in the 2008 DreamWorks Animation film franchise Kung Fu Panda, is a Chinese mantis and one of the members of the Furious Five.

== Gallery ==
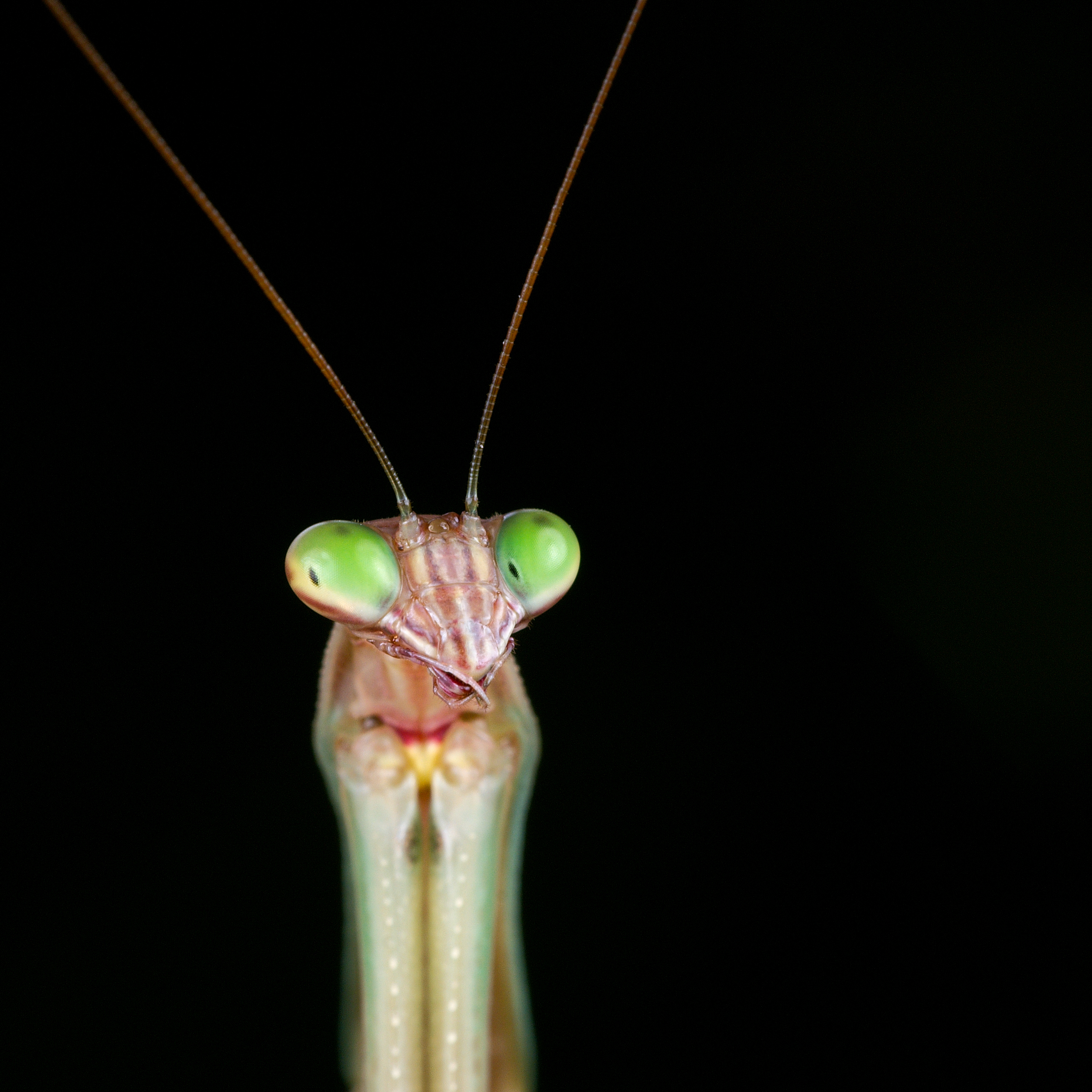
Adult male

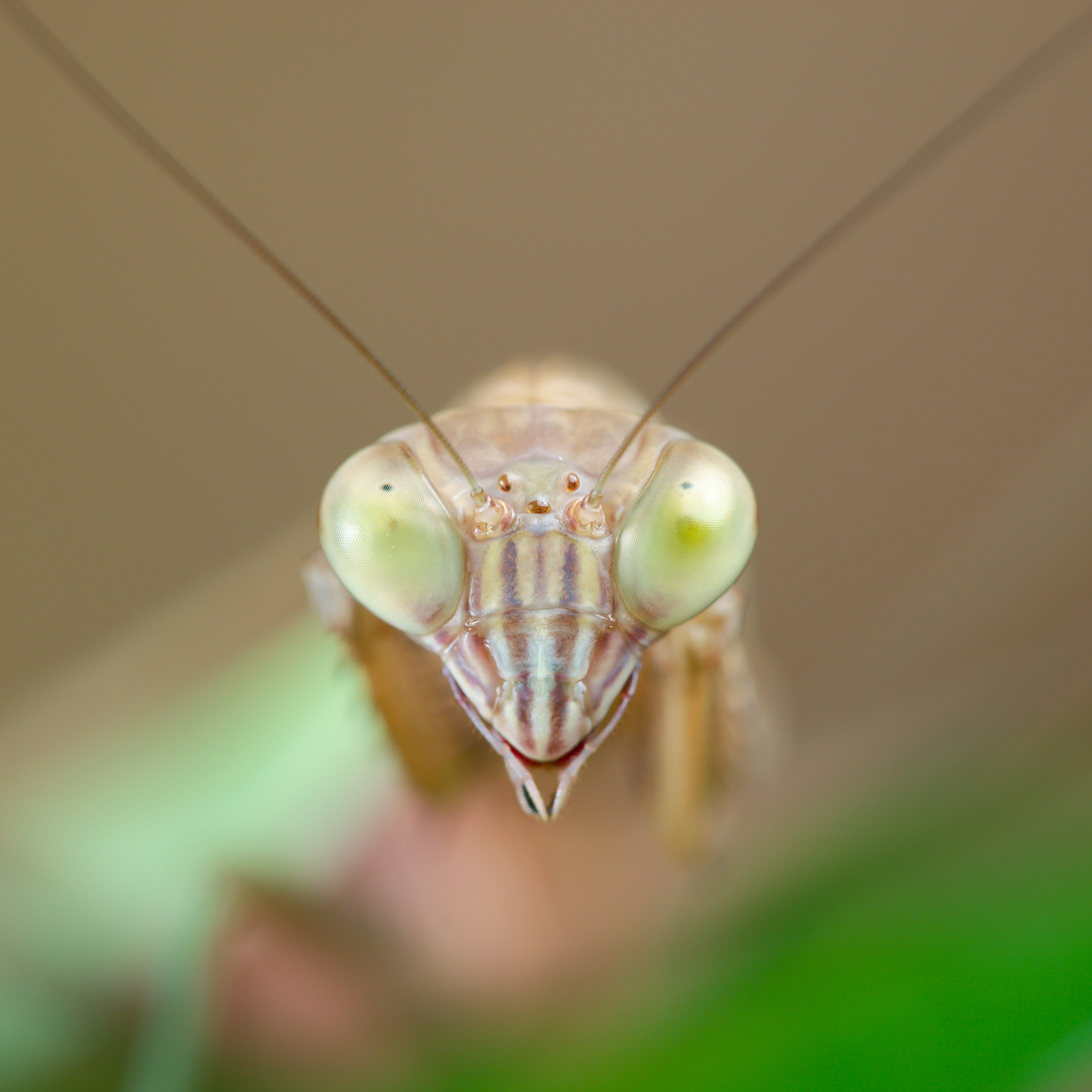
Adult female

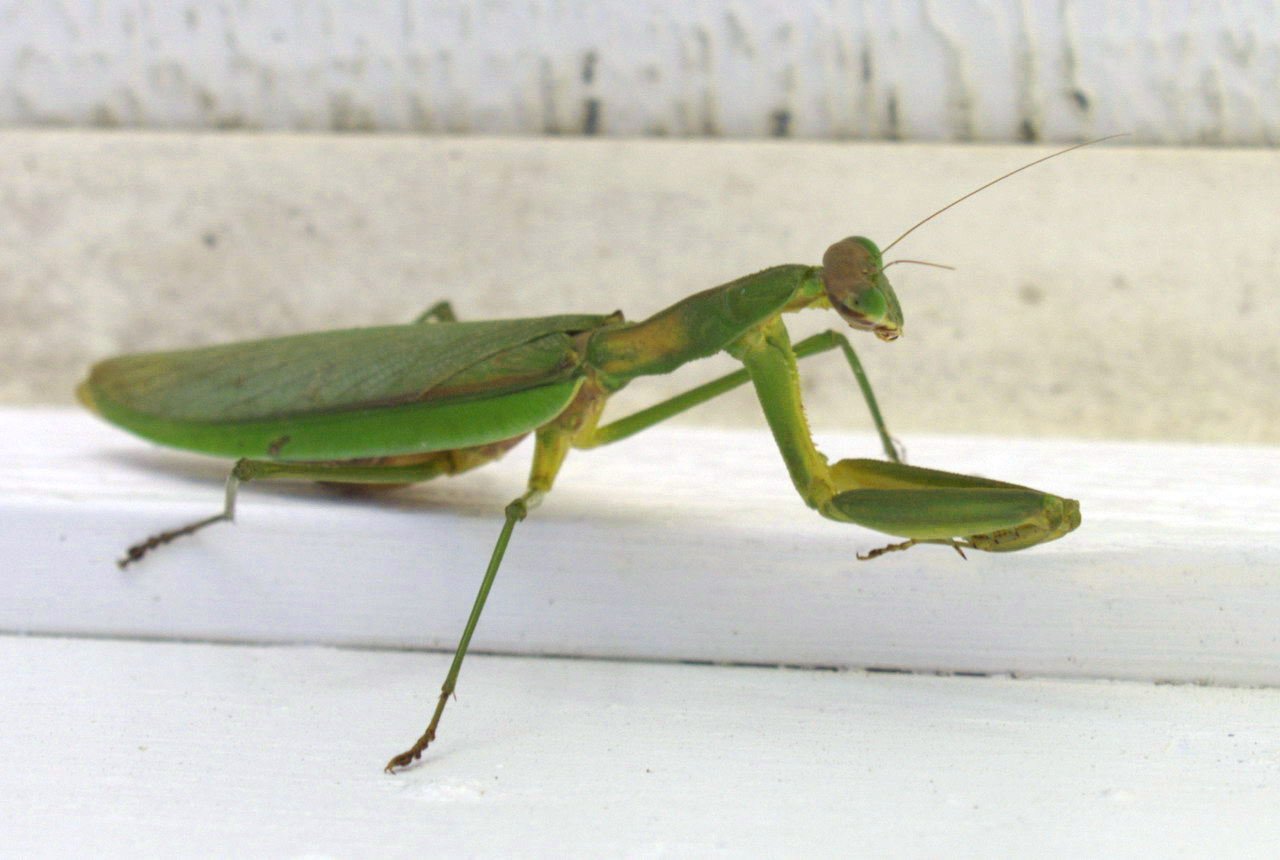
Adult at rest

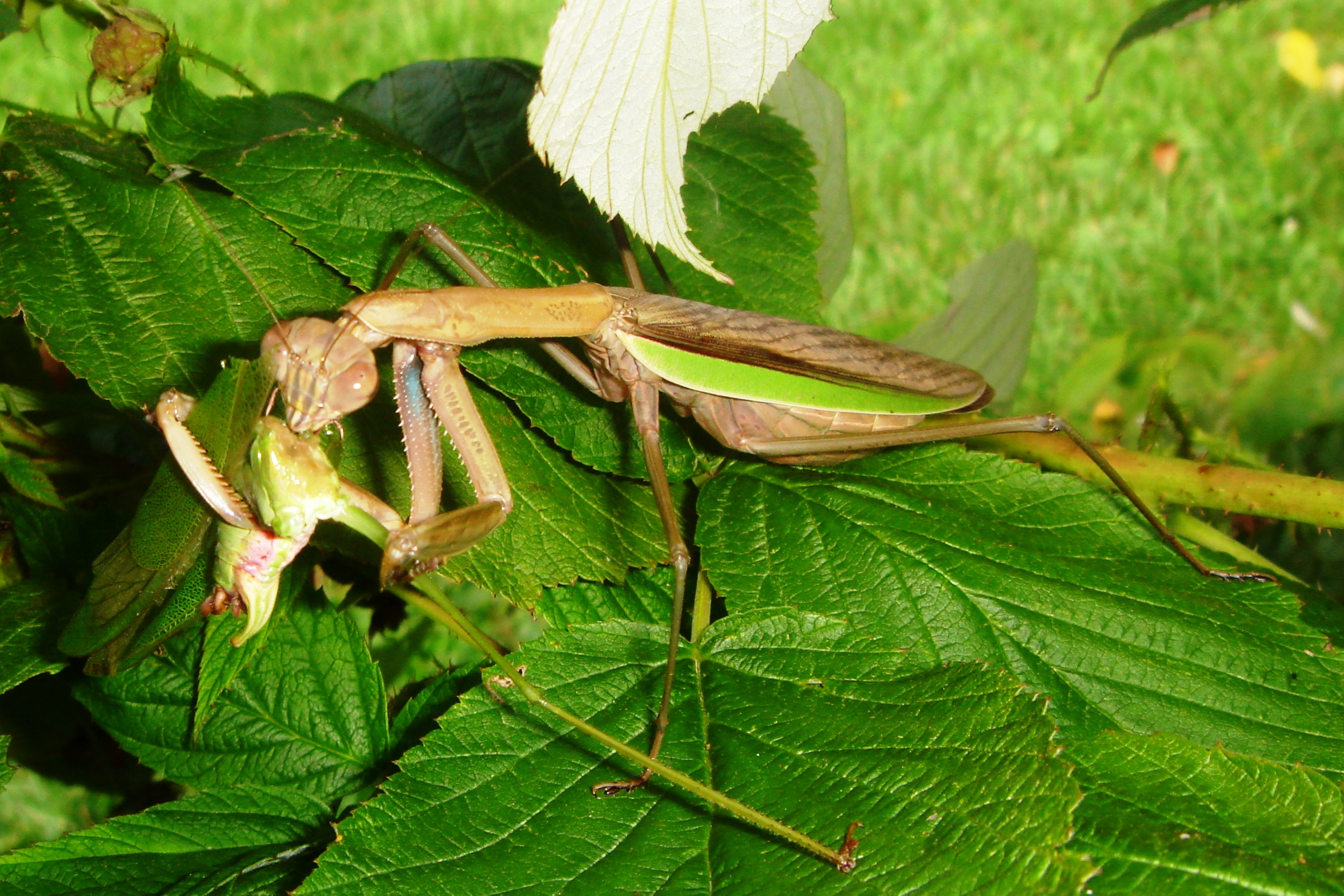
Adult female T. sinensis eating a long-horned grasshopper

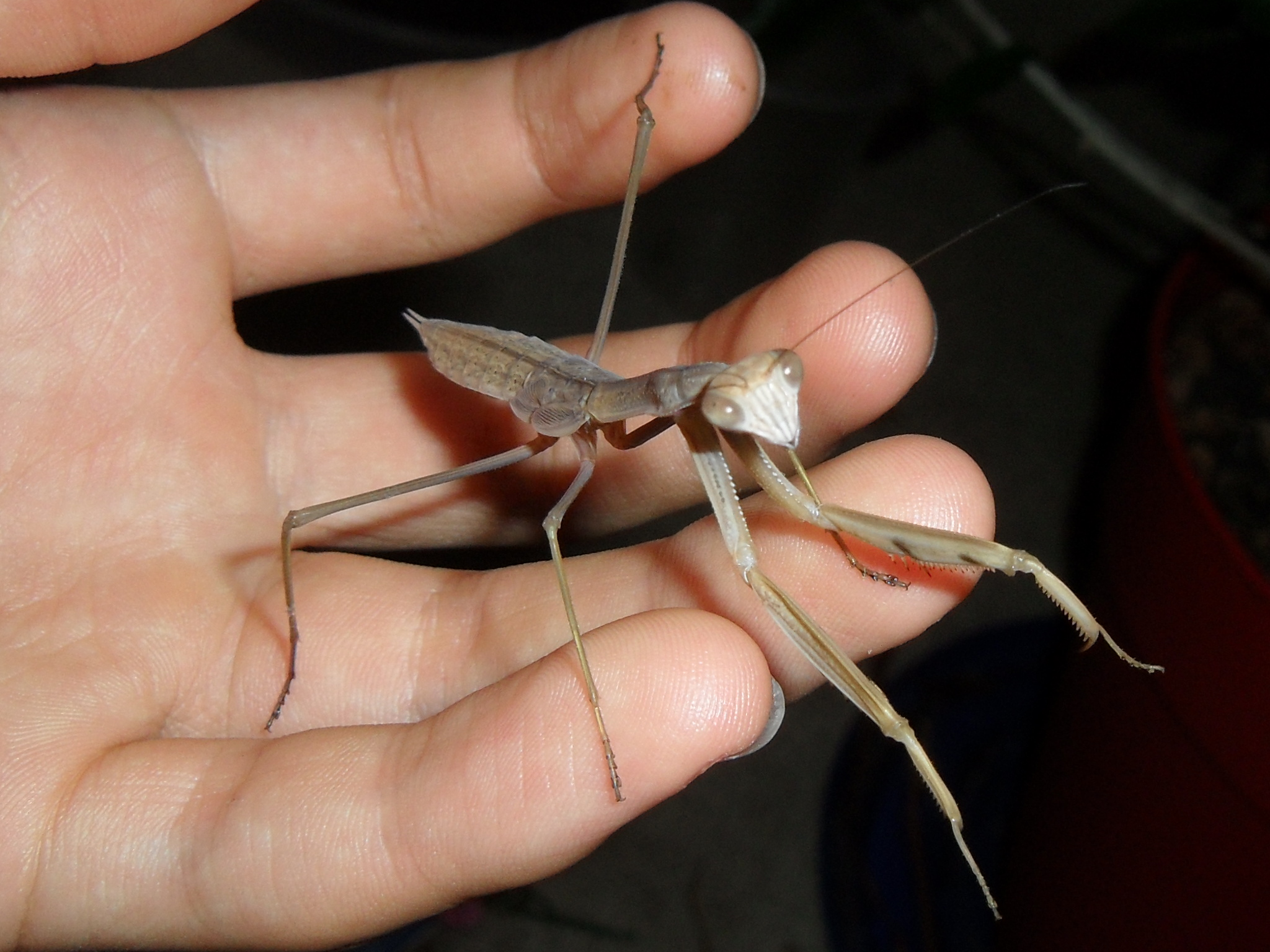
Subadult female in hand

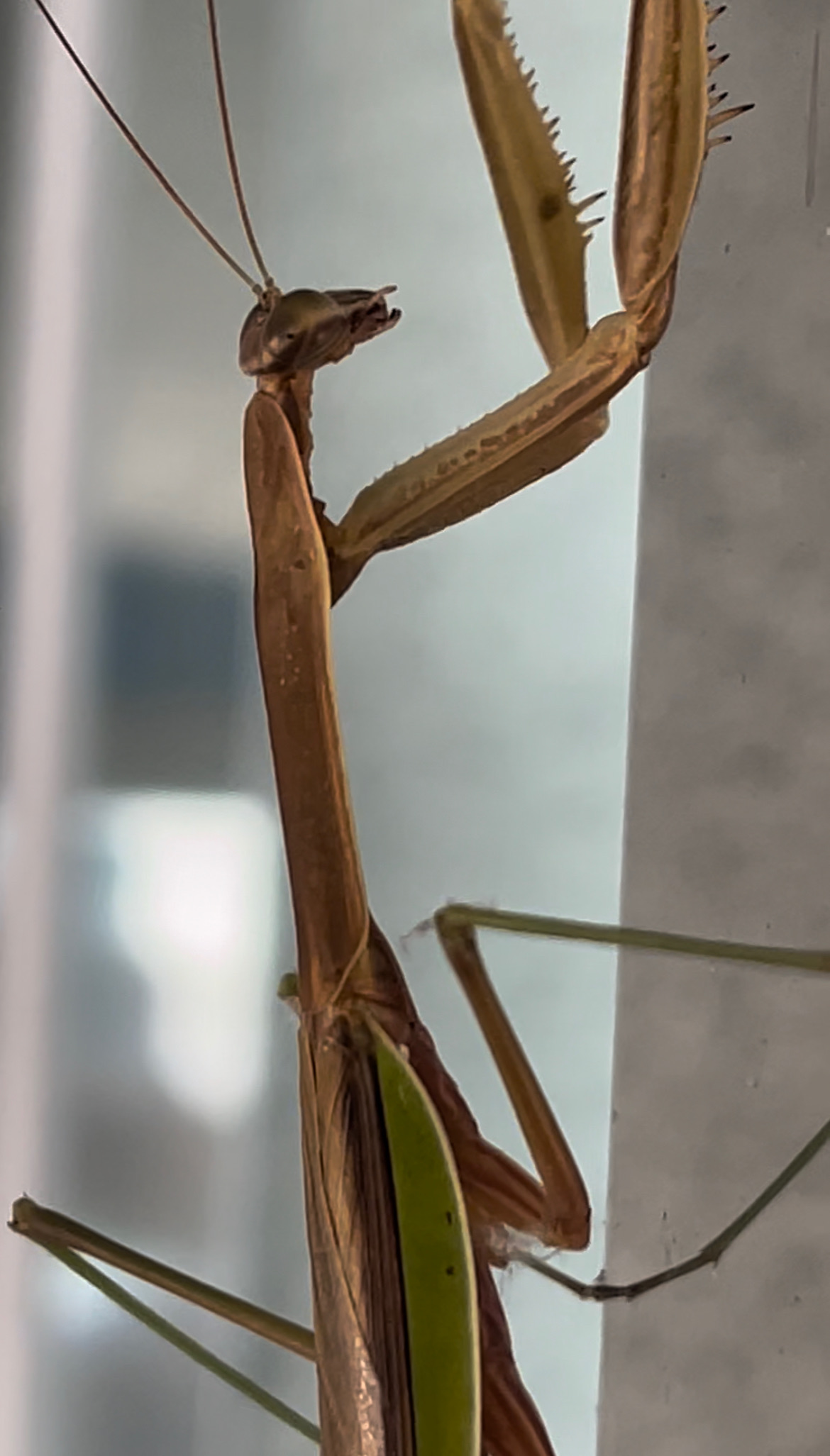
Adult female on a wall

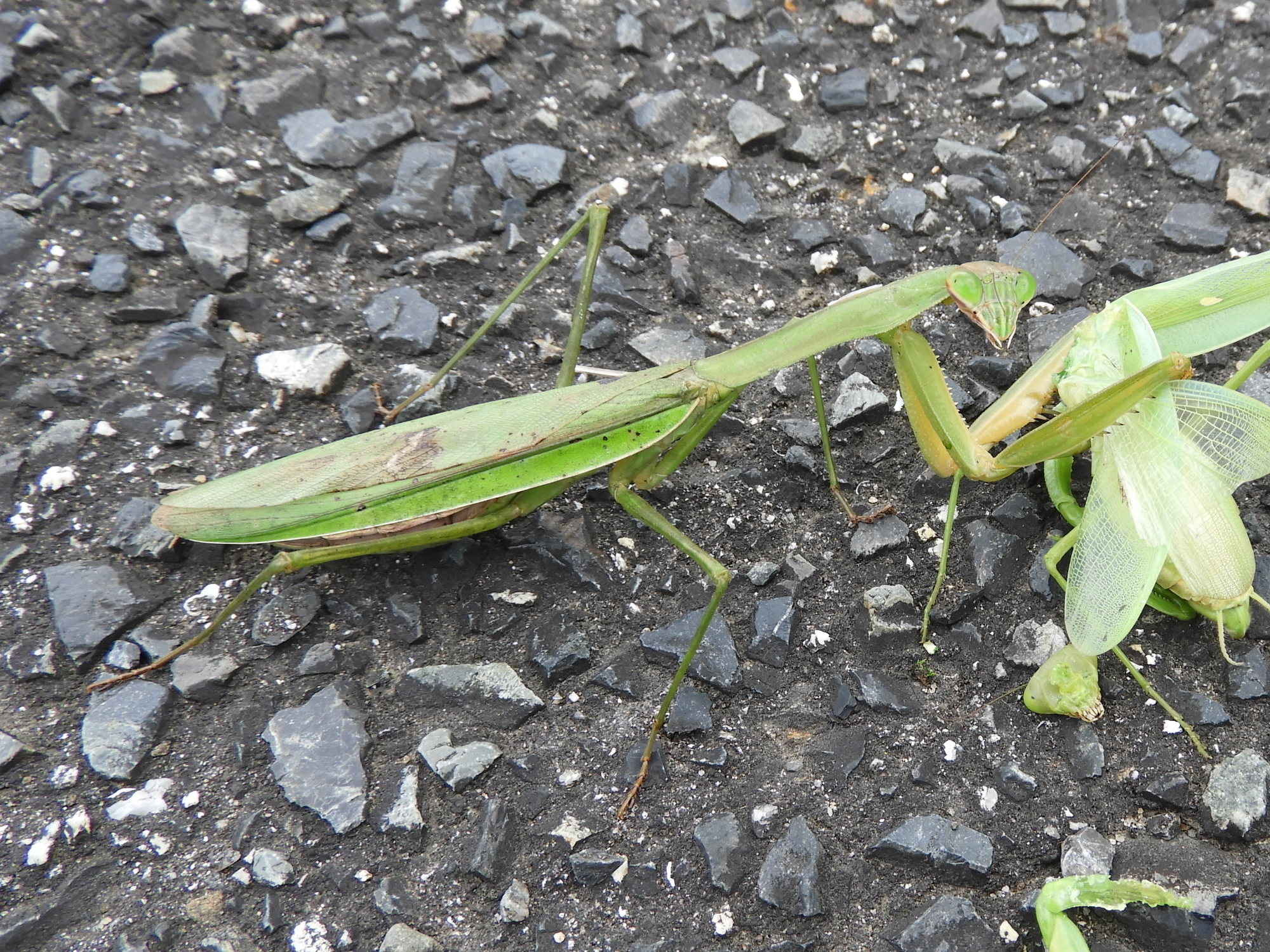
Female eating Hierodula patellifera

== See also ==
- List of mantis genera and species
