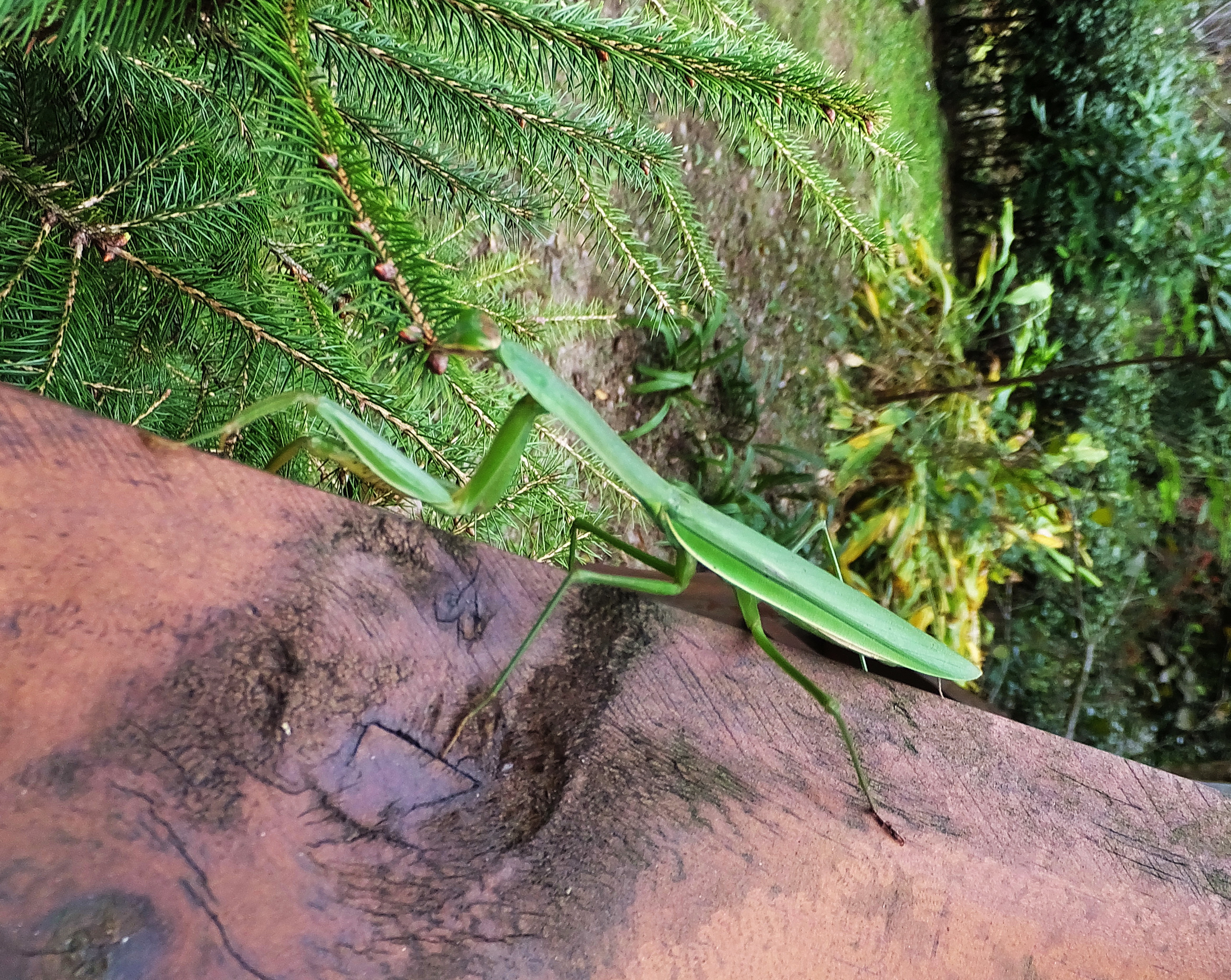
- Adult female

Scientific classification
- Kingdom: Animalia
- Phylum: Arthropoda
- Clade: Pancrustacea
- Class: Insecta
- Order: Mantodea
- Family: Mantidae
- Genus: Tenodera
- Species: T. aridifolia

Binomial name
- Tenodera aridifolia (Stoll, 1813)

Subspecies
- T. a. aridifolia (Stoll, 1813); T. a. brevicollis (Breier, 1933)

= Tenodera aridifolia =

Species of praying mantis

Japanese giant mantis in Kanagawa, Japan

Tenodera aridifolia, the Japanese giant mantis, is a species of mantis in the subfamily Tenoderinae. The Chinese mantis, T. sinensis, was once considered to be a subspecies of T. aridifolia, but the species can be distinguished by the shape of male genitalia.

== Description ==
Adults are large and slender, with long raptorial forelegs and triangular head. Females are typically between 80-105 mm, and males are typically smaller at 65-85mm. Colour can vary depending on the habitat, from light green to brown. A distinctive feature is a yellowish spot on the base of the fore-coxa, and the hind wings are dark brown to purplish when opened which is key trait for determining the difference between Tenodera aridifolia and T. sinensis.

== Distribution and habitat ==
They are widely distributed across tropical and subtropical East Asia. They are found in southern China, Taiwan, and Southeast Asia.. Despite its name, the species is absent from the temperate regions with harsher winters like northern China, Korea, and mainland Japan, where Tenodera sinensis replaces it.

The Japanese giant mantis thrives in warm, open habitats with abundant prey. Places such as gardens, cultivated fields, forest edges, shrublands and rice fields with dense vegetation are suitable habitats.

== Mating ==
Tenodera aridifolia have different types of mating behaviours, however sexual cannibalism is one of the more well known behaviours within mantids. In praying mantids, including Tenodera aridifolia, sexual cannibalism occurs 13-28% of the time in natural encounters, which can result in high mortality of males during the breeding season. Cannibalism depends on body size; both young and old mantids battle with each other, with the winner eating the loser. Pheromone emission by females might result in multiple mating for females, with males also being able to mate multiple times. As females can have multiple mates during breeding season, the occurrence of multiple paternity has been observed. Males can determine mating status of females based on smell. Female emitted pheromones are important for long distance attraction of mates. Visual cues and signals can be important for mate attraction at short distances. Males detection and location of a female is guided largely by sight, using sight also to help with species identification and provide insight on females phenotype, physiological condition and predatory posturing.

== Predatory behaviour ==
Tenodera aridifolia as well as other mantid species rely on their cryptic colouration and immobile stance to remain cryptic within dense vegetation, which assists them in ambushing prey and avoiding predation. Tenodera aridifolia is also an opportunistic generalist predator capturing many kinds of insects, spiders and small invertebrates. They detect prey mainly through vision and capture it with their raptorial forelimbs.

=== Prey tracking ===
Tracking and fixating on prey happens by the moving of the head before striking the prey. When detecting and analyzing a small moving object such as a prey item, the mantis keeps the image of a target on a foveal region. This is called visual tracking. The smooth tracking enables mantids to maintain the position of their targets entirely within the foveal region.

=== Stage-specific site selection ===
There are varying preferences for site selection as well as for specific vegetation according to mantid developmental stage. Later instar mantids prefer leaves with larger area, with early instar mantids preferring small leaves. Choosing vegetation that is sturdy enough for mantids to pounce efficiently on prey. Preference for locations at or near the top of vegetation regardless of developmental stage of the mantid have been observed. Likely to maximize foraging efficiency and to avoid predation.

== Defensive behaviours ==
Various defensive responses have been observed in Tenodera aridifolia. The type of response is often dependent on the developmental stage of the mantis. Small mantids tend to show immobility and cryptic responses for avoiding predators, while larger mantids tend to exhibit deimatic and defensive strike responses for threatening predators. When it comes to rapidly approaching objects that could be potential dangers such as predators or an impending collision, the looming visual stimuli evokes three kinds of behaviours. These behaviours being fixation, evasion and cryptic reactions.

== Subspecies ==
There are two subspecies:

- Tenodera aridifolia aridifolia (Stoll, 1813)
- Tenodera aridifolia brevicollis (Breier, 1933)

== Gallery ==
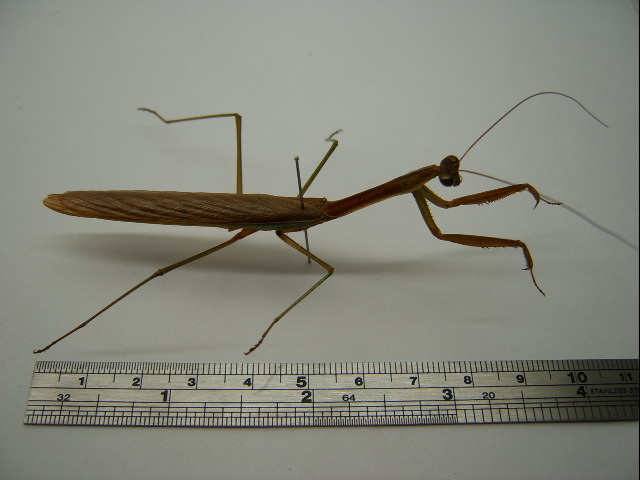
Adult male in Taipei, Taiwan
