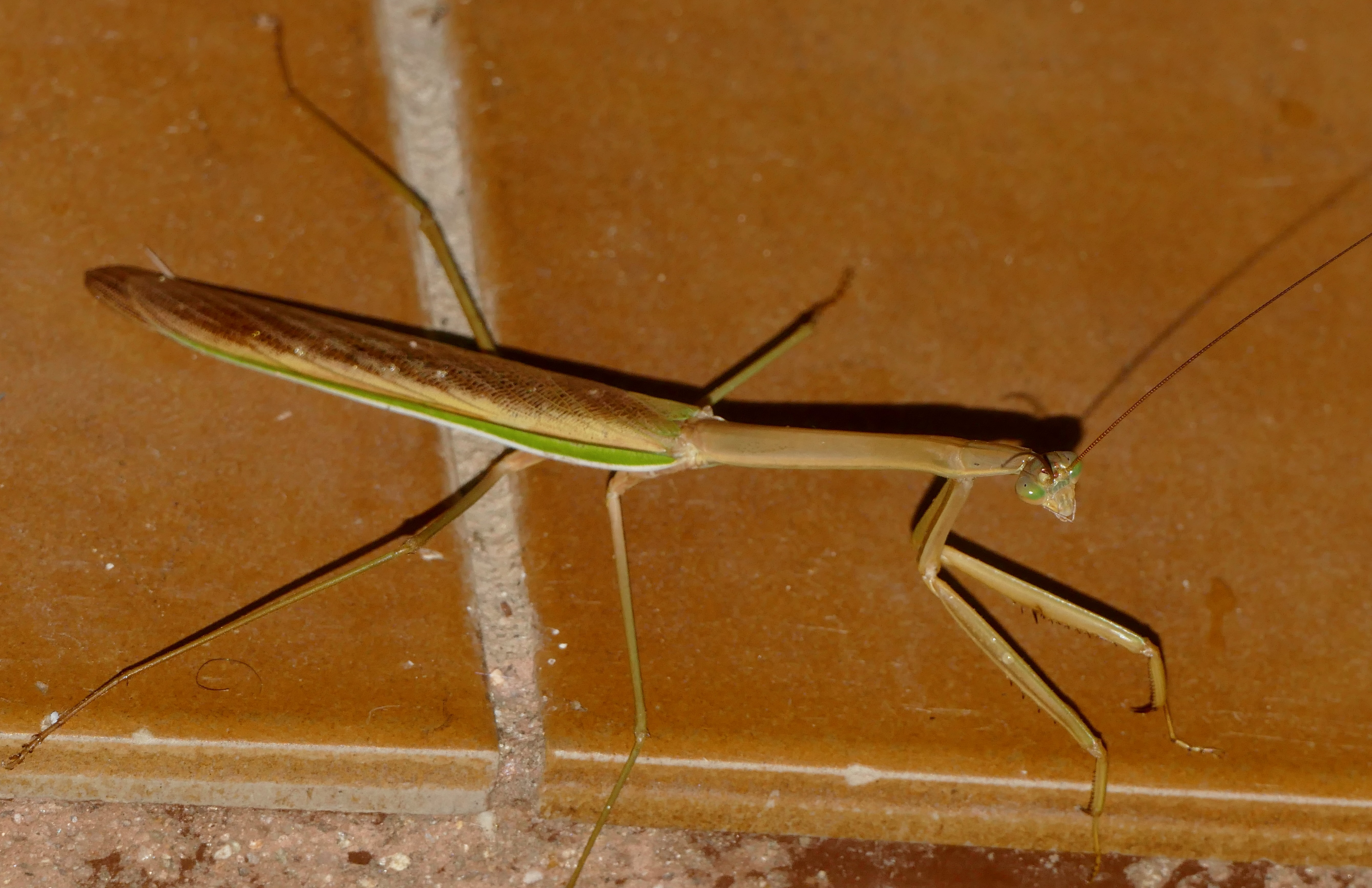

Scientific classification
- Kingdom: Animalia
- Phylum: Arthropoda
- Clade: Pancrustacea
- Class: Insecta
- Order: Mantodea
- Family: Mantidae
- Genus: Tenodera
- Species: T. superstitiosa

Binomial name
- Tenodera superstitiosa (Fabricius, 1781)

Synonyms
- Tenodera fabricius madagascariensis (Saussure & Zehntner, 1895)

= Tenodera superstitiosa =

Species of praying mantis

Tenodera superstitiosa is a species in the family Mantidae.

== Range ==
It is found in West Africa (Cameroon, Ivory Coast, Guinea, Ghana, Mauritania, Republic of the Congo, Sierra Leone, Burkina Faso).

== Subspecies ==
- Tenodera superstitiosa superstitiosa (Fabricius, 1781)
- Tenodera superstitiosa bokiana (Giglio-Tos, 1907), may not be a valid subspecies
