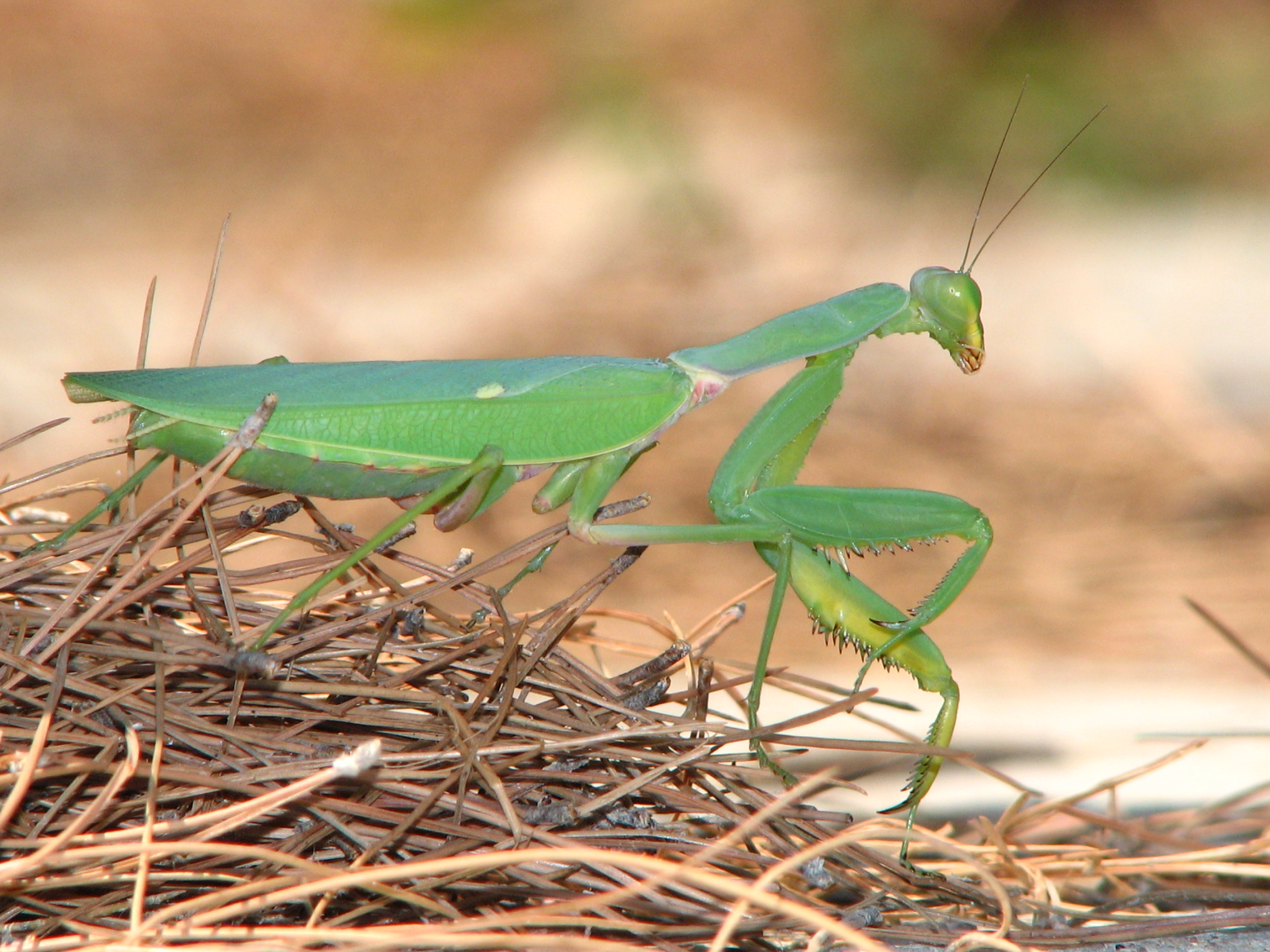

Conservation status
- Least Concern (IUCN 3.1)

Scientific classification
- Kingdom: Animalia
- Phylum: Arthropoda
- Clade: Pancrustacea
- Class: Insecta
- Order: Mantodea
- Family: Mantidae
- Genus: Sphodromantis
- Species: S. viridis

Binomial name
- Sphodromantis viridis Forsskål, 1775

Synonyms
- Stagmatoptera vischeri Werner, 1933

= Sphodromantis viridis =

Species of praying mantis

Sphodromantis viridis is a species of praying mantis that is kept worldwide as a pet. Its common names include African mantis, giant African mantis, and bush mantis.

== Name ==
Sphodromantis viridis is popularly called the African mantis, but that common name is shared with not only other species in its genus (i.e. S. belachowski, S. centralis, S. gastrica, S. lineola, etc.), but also Miomantis caffra and others, as well.

== Range ==
Sphodromantis viridis is native to West Africa south of the Sahara Desert. It can also be found as an introduced species in areas outside its original range, including Israel and Spain.

== Description ==
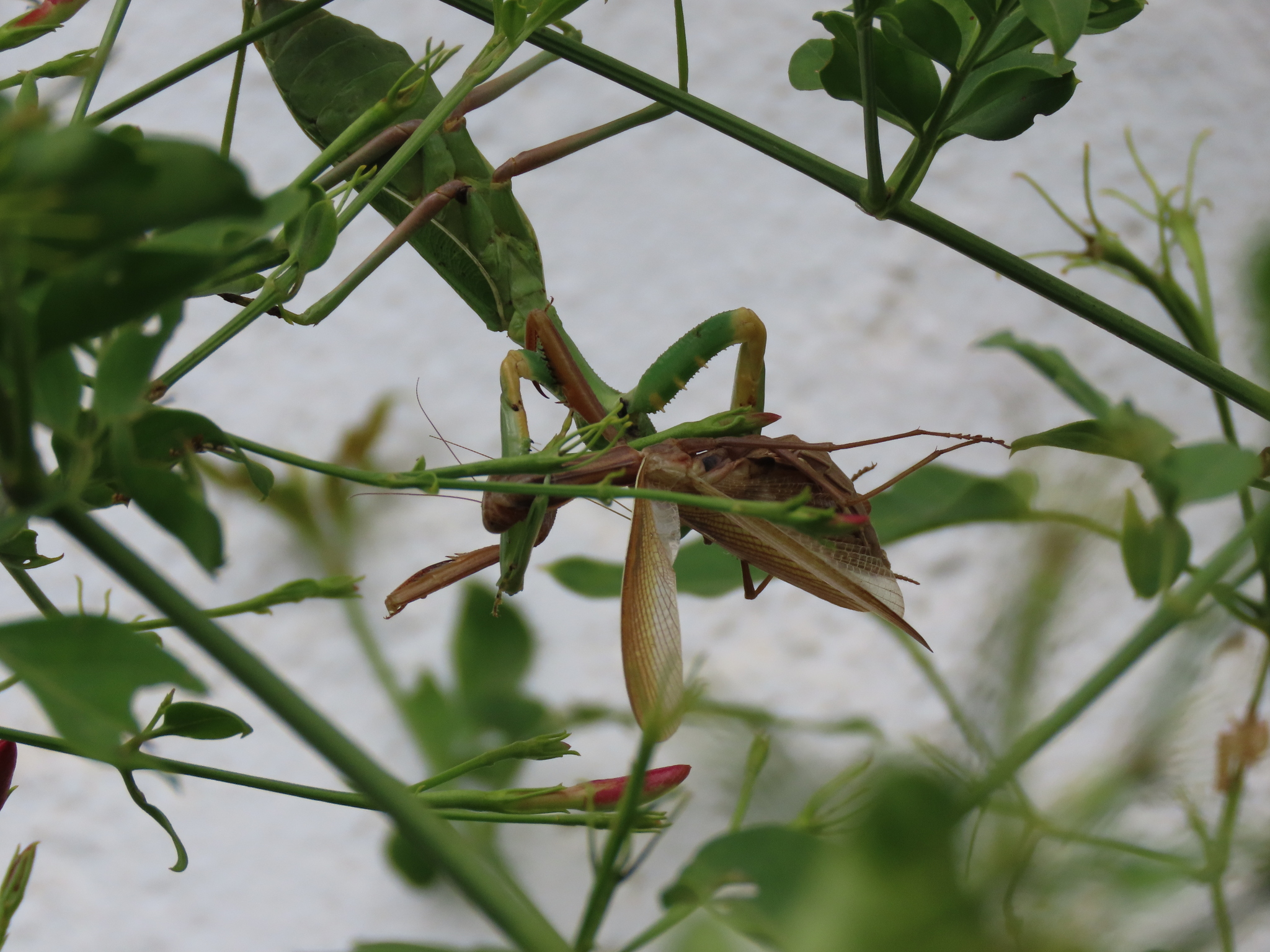
Eating a European mantis, in Andalucía (Spain).

Despite its scientific name (viridis is Latin for green) this insect ranges in color from bright green to dull brown. Females can reach 10 cm (3.9 in) in length. Sexual dimorphism is typical of mantises; the male is much smaller. Females may also be distinguished from males as they have a six-segmented abdomen compared to an eight-segmented abdomen of the male.

As adults, both sexes have a distinctive white spot on their wings. They have a yellowish color on their inner fore leg distinguishable from the black eyespot and white dots of the European mantis Mantis religiosa with which it shares some range.

== Reproduction ==
As with most mantis species, S. viridis males are frequently the victims of sexual cannibalism. A female produces an ootheca within a few days of mating and can produce several before she ends her lifecycle. Each ootheca produces up to 300 nymphs when it hatches. This species has also been noted to have reproduced parthenogenically.

== Cultivation ==
Because of its size and hardiness, S. viridis is popular among those who keep insects as pets. S. viridis "is an easy species to keep, very suitable for beginners...They will happily take food of their own size and they will also take pieces of meat if it is offered on a pair of tweezers". They are also more tolerant of changes in humidity and temperature than are many other species.

Another breeder of mantises states that S. viridis:

...is an attractive species due to its aggressiveness. Anyone interested in looking at how a praying mantis chase down its prey and devour it greedily, this is the species! ...they are not as bulky as Sphodromantis Lineola but aggressive nevertheless. This species was easy to raise, feed them plenty of roaches, crickets, and wild caught flying insects, and they will gladly accept the food. Mating this species was not difficult at all, [the] male will initiate the move and [the] female will be more cooperative when fed well. A warm, well-heated enclosure of about 90°F works as a catalyst to further improve the chances of mating.

== See also ==
- List of mantis genera and species
