= Sphodromantis biocellata =

Scientific classification
- Kingdom: Animalia
- Phylum: Arthropoda
- Clade: Pancrustacea
- Class: Insecta
- Order: Mantodea
- Family: Mantidae
- Genus: Sphodromantis
- Species: S. biocellata

Binomial name
- Sphodromantis biocellata (Werner, 1906)

Synonyms
- Hierodula biocellata Werner, 1906

Species of praying mantis

Sphodromantis biocellata is a species of praying mantis found in Angola, Cameroon, and Central African Republic.

== See also ==
- African mantis
- List of mantis genera and species
