= Sphodromantis royi =

Scientific classification
- Kingdom: Animalia
- Phylum: Arthropoda
- Clade: Pancrustacea
- Class: Insecta
- Order: Mantodea
- Family: Mantidae
- Genus: Sphodromantis
- Species: S. royi

Binomial name
- Sphodromantis royi La Greca, 1967

Species of praying mantis

Sphodromantis royi, common name Roy's mantis, is a species of praying mantis found in West Africa (Burkina Faso, Mali, Mauritania, Niger, and Senegal).

== See also ==
- African mantis
- List of mantis genera and species
