= Sphodromantis gracilis =

Scientific classification
- Kingdom: Animalia
- Phylum: Arthropoda
- Clade: Pancrustacea
- Class: Insecta
- Order: Mantodea
- Family: Mantidae
- Genus: Sphodromantis
- Species: S. gracilis

Binomial name
- Sphodromantis gracilis Lombardo, 1992

Species of praying mantis

Sphodromantis gracilis is a species of praying mantis native to southern Africa.

It is found in the Transvaal region of South Africa.

== See also ==
- African mantis
- List of mantis genera and species
