= Sphodromantis annobonensis =

Scientific classification
- Kingdom: Animalia
- Phylum: Arthropoda
- Clade: Pancrustacea
- Class: Insecta
- Order: Mantodea
- Family: Mantidae
- Genus: Sphodromantis
- Species: S. annobonensis

Binomial name
- Sphodromantis annobonensis Llorente, 1967

Species of praying mantis

Sphodromantis annobonensis is a species of praying mantis in the family Mantidae. It occurs on the island of Annobón, Equatorial Guinea.

== See also ==
- African mantis
- List of mantis genera and species
