= Sphodromantis elongata =

Scientific classification
- Kingdom: Animalia
- Phylum: Arthropoda
- Clade: Pancrustacea
- Class: Insecta
- Order: Mantodea
- Family: Mantidae
- Genus: Sphodromantis
- Species: S. elongata

Binomial name
- Sphodromantis elongata La Greca, 1969

Species of praying mantis

Sphodromantis elongata is a species of praying mantis found in Zambia and the Congo River region.

== See also ==
- African mantis
- List of mantis genera and species
