= Sphodromantis pachinota =

Scientific classification
- Kingdom: Animalia
- Phylum: Arthropoda
- Clade: Pancrustacea
- Class: Insecta
- Order: Mantodea
- Family: Mantidae
- Genus: Sphodromantis
- Species: S. pachinota

Binomial name
- Sphodromantis pachinota La Greca & Lombardo, 1987

Species of praying mantis

Sphodromantis pachinota is a species of praying mantis found in Ethiopia and Sudan.

== See also ==
- African mantis
- List of mantis genera and species
