= Sphodromantis rudolfae =

Scientific classification
- Kingdom: Animalia
- Phylum: Arthropoda
- Clade: Pancrustacea
- Class: Insecta
- Order: Mantodea
- Family: Mantidae
- Genus: Sphodromantis
- Species: S. rudolfae

Binomial name
- Sphodromantis rudolfae Rehn, 1901

Species of praying mantis

Sphodromantis rudolfae is a species of praying mantis found in East Africa (Ethiopia, Kenya, Somalia, and Zanzibar).

== See also ==
- African mantis
- List of mantis genera and species
