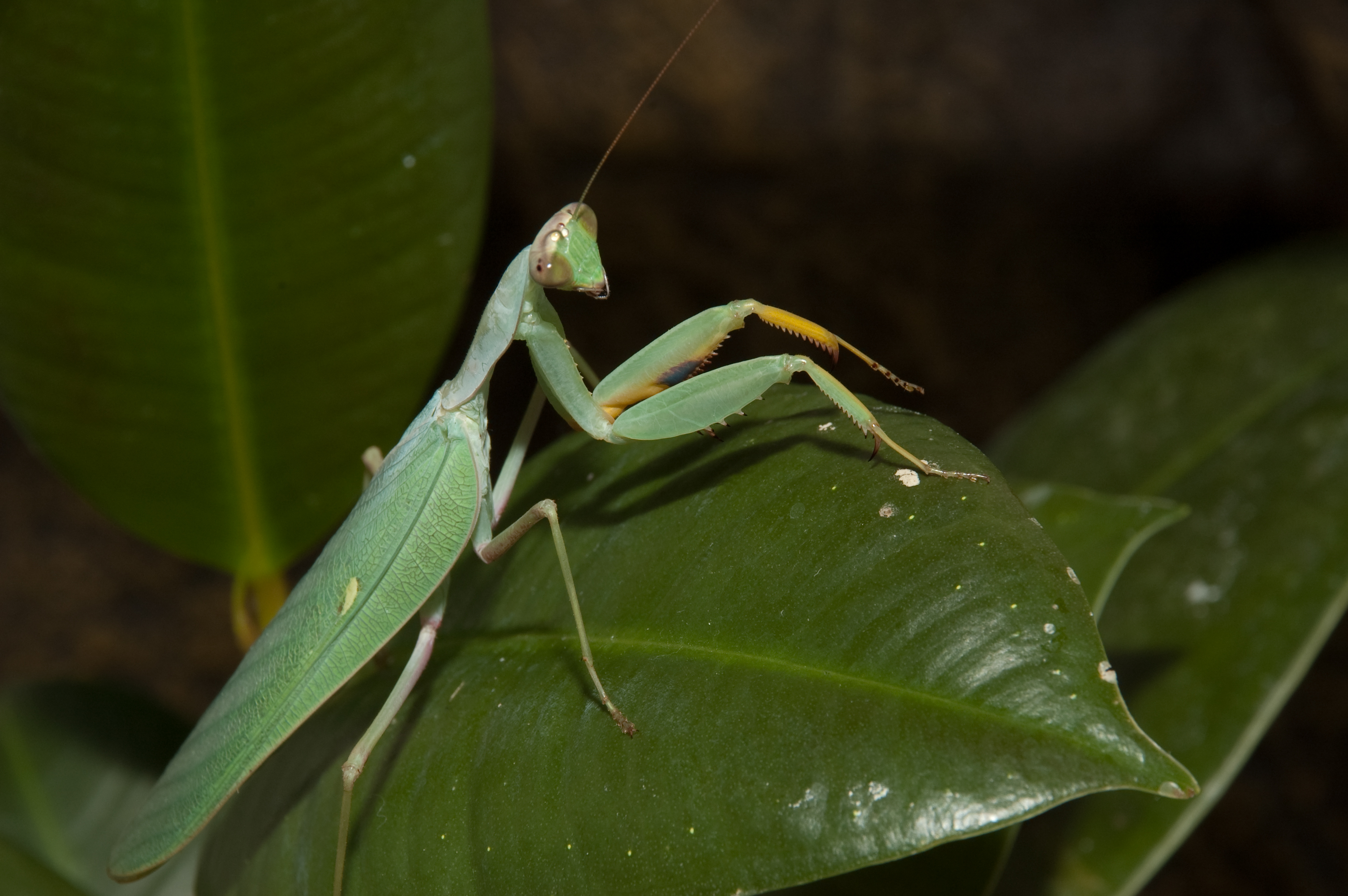

Scientific classification
- Kingdom: Animalia
- Phylum: Arthropoda
- Clade: Pancrustacea
- Class: Insecta
- Order: Mantodea
- Family: Mantidae
- Genus: Sphodromantis
- Species: S. baccettii

Binomial name
- Sphodromantis baccettii La Greca & Lombardo, 1987

= Sphodromantis baccettii =

Species of praying mantis

Sphodromantis baccettii is a species of praying mantis found in Kenya and Somalia. It may be distinguished from Sphodromantis lineola by the presence of blue-black spots on its forearms.

== See also ==
- African mantis
- List of mantis genera and species
