= Sphodromantis tenuidentata =

Scientific classification
- Kingdom: Animalia
- Phylum: Arthropoda
- Clade: Pancrustacea
- Class: Insecta
- Order: Mantodea
- Family: Mantidae
- Genus: Sphodromantis
- Species: S. tenuidentata

Binomial name
- Sphodromantis tenuidentata Lombardo, 1991

Species of praying mantis

Sphodromantis tenuidentata, common name Tanzanian mantis, is a species of praying mantis found in Tanzania.

== See also ==
- African mantis
- List of mantis genera and species
