= Sphodromantis aurea =

Scientific classification
- Kingdom: Animalia
- Phylum: Arthropoda
- Clade: Pancrustacea
- Class: Insecta
- Order: Mantodea
- Family: Mantidae
- Genus: Sphodromantis
- Species: S. aurea

Binomial name
- Sphodromantis aurea Giglio-Tos, 1917

Species of praying mantis

Sphodromantis aurea is a species of praying mantis found in Liberia and Ghana.

== See also ==
- African mantis
- List of mantis genera and species
