= Sphodromantis rubrostigma =

Scientific classification
- Kingdom: Animalia
- Phylum: Arthropoda
- Clade: Pancrustacea
- Class: Insecta
- Order: Mantodea
- Family: Mantidae
- Genus: Sphodromantis
- Species: S. rubrostigma

Binomial name
- Sphodromantis rubrostigma Werner, 1916

Species of praying mantis

Sphodromantis rubrostigma, common name Kenya mantis, is a species of praying mantis found in Kenya and Tanzania.

== See also ==
- African mantis
- List of mantis genera and species
