= Sphodromantis kersteni =

Scientific classification
- Kingdom: Animalia
- Phylum: Arthropoda
- Clade: Pancrustacea
- Class: Insecta
- Order: Mantodea
- Family: Mantidae
- Genus: Sphodromantis
- Species: S. kersteni

Binomial name
- Sphodromantis kersteni Gerstaecker, 1869

Synonyms
- Mantis kersteni Stal; Sphodromantis christina Kirby, 1904

Species of praying mantis

Sphodromantis kersteni is a species of praying mantis found in Kenya, Tanzania, and Sudan.

== See also ==
- African mantis
- List of mantis genera and species
- Follow more important articles
