= Sphodromantis pavonina =

Scientific classification
- Kingdom: Animalia
- Phylum: Arthropoda
- Clade: Pancrustacea
- Class: Insecta
- Order: Mantodea
- Family: Mantidae
- Genus: Sphodromantis
- Species: S. pavonina

Binomial name
- Sphodromantis pavonina La Greca, 1955

Species of praying mantis

Sphodromantis pavonina is a species of praying mantis found in Angola, Cameroon, and the Congo River region.

== See also ==
- African mantis
- List of mantis genera and species
