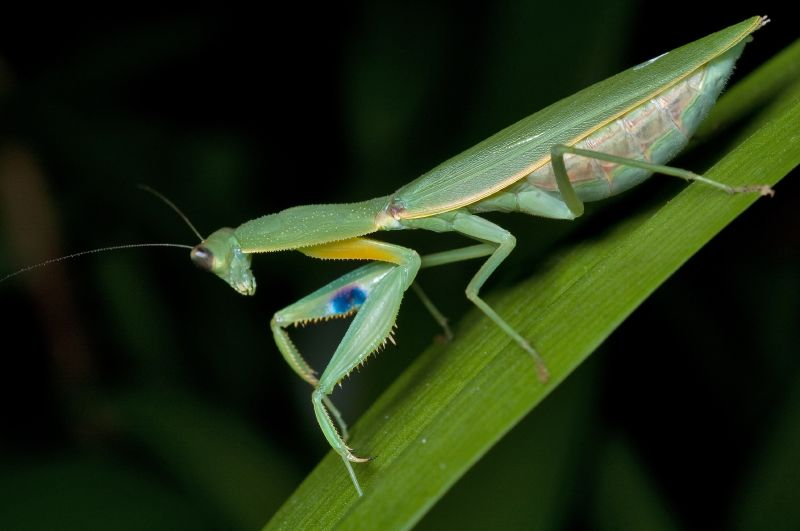

Scientific classification
- Kingdom: Animalia
- Phylum: Arthropoda
- Clade: Pancrustacea
- Class: Insecta
- Order: Mantodea
- Family: Mantidae
- Genus: Orthodera
- Species: O. novaezealandiae

Binomial name
- Orthodera novaezealandiae (Colenso, 1882)

= Orthodera novaezealandiae =

Species of insect

Orthodera novaezealandiae, (Māori: whe) known as the New Zealand mantis or New Zealand praying mantis, is a species of praying mantis which is, as both the scientific name and common names suggest, indigenous and endemic to New Zealand.

== Description ==
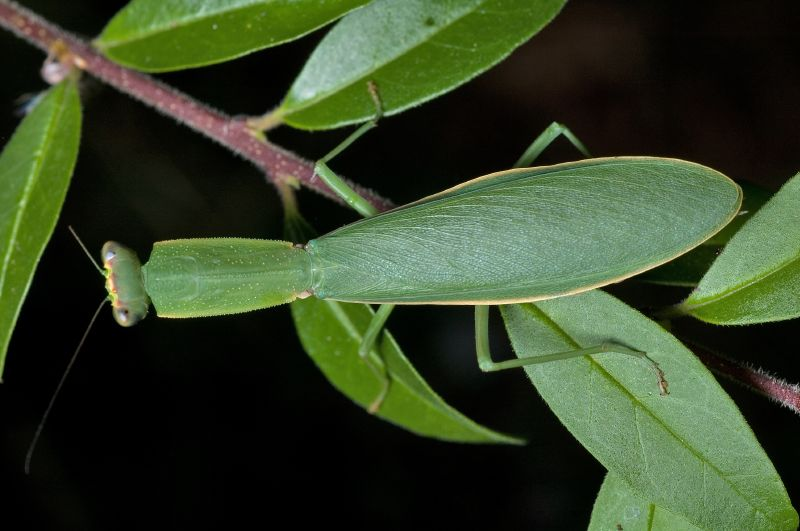
Female viewed from above

O. novaezealandiae nymphs are pale, translucent green with a dark stripe running from head to end of abdomen. As adults, they are bright green and grow to between 35 mm and 40 mm in length.(see note) As in most mantis species, sexual dimorphism means the female is larger.

The New Zealand mantis has a triangular head with slightly oversized compound eyes that give it excellent binocular vision (although they do have a blind spot). Its wings differ from those of other species in the "development of the archedictyon and the absence of cross-veins in the forewing".

"A very active little Mantis", O. novaezealandiae is well adapted as a predator. Its specialised forelimbs are long and equipped with extremely sharp spikes to trap prey. Blue eyespots on the underside of the insect's forelegs help in differentiating this species from Miomantis caffra, an introduced species from South Africa that became established in New Zealand during the 1970s.

The ootheca of the New Zealand mantis has eggs arranged in two rows, quite different from the messier egg mass of Miomantis caffra. Oothecae are generally arranged facing north towards the sun, on the warm faces of branches and tree trunks.

== Ecology ==
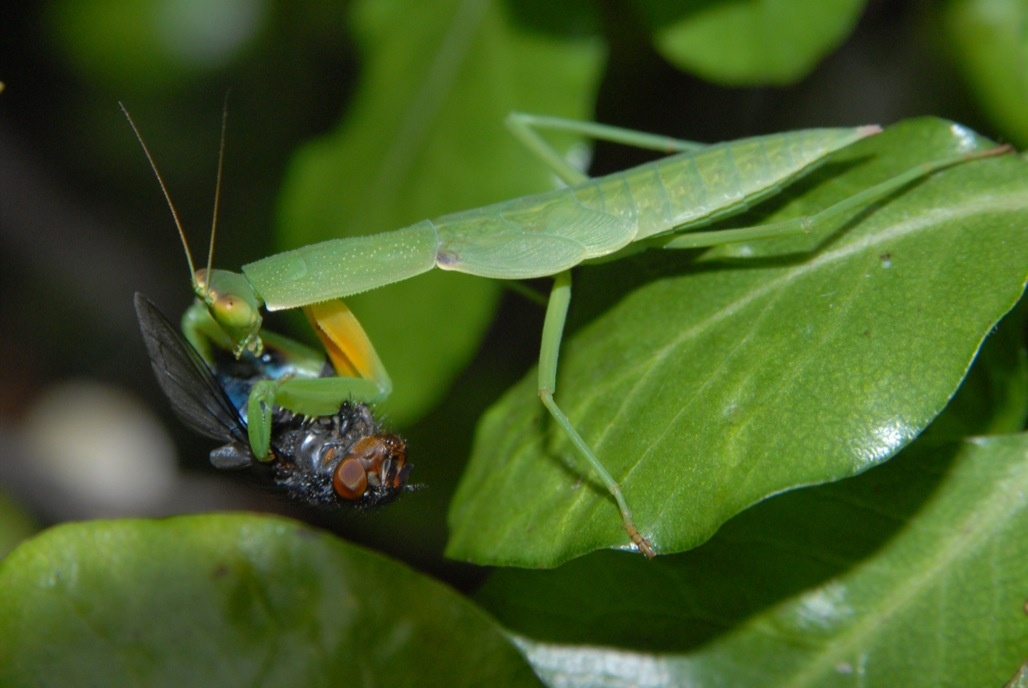
A nymph eating a fly

O. novaezealandiae prefer open, shrubby terrain which is similar to leafy vegetation and may be used as camouflage to ambush prey. It can reach high numbers in the branches of small mānuka and kānuka trees in open meadow-like habitats where grass-dwelling prey such as small moths are abundant. It hides well from predators and is near or at the top of the invertebrate food chain in its habitat. As an endemic species of New Zealand that eats pests and has a very large appetite, O. novaezealandiae is a beneficial insect to those involved in agriculture and they are used in many gardens.

The New Zealand mantis is vulnerable to the use of pesticides, both directly and through the effects of a diminished food supply, and their ootheca are sometimes attacked by parasitic wasps. Male O.novaezealandiae appear to be attracted to females of the introduced species M. caffra, which can result in their fatality due to the sexually-cannibalistic behaviour of the latter species. Unlike the introduced species, O.novaezealandiae females rarely engage in cannibalism.

The only two species of mantis in New Zealand are this native species and the previously mentioned introduced species M. caffra discovered as established in the Auckland suburb of New Lynn in 1978. O. novaezealandiae is taxonomically very close to, and has sometimes been considered conspecific and synonymous with, the Australian species O. ministralis.

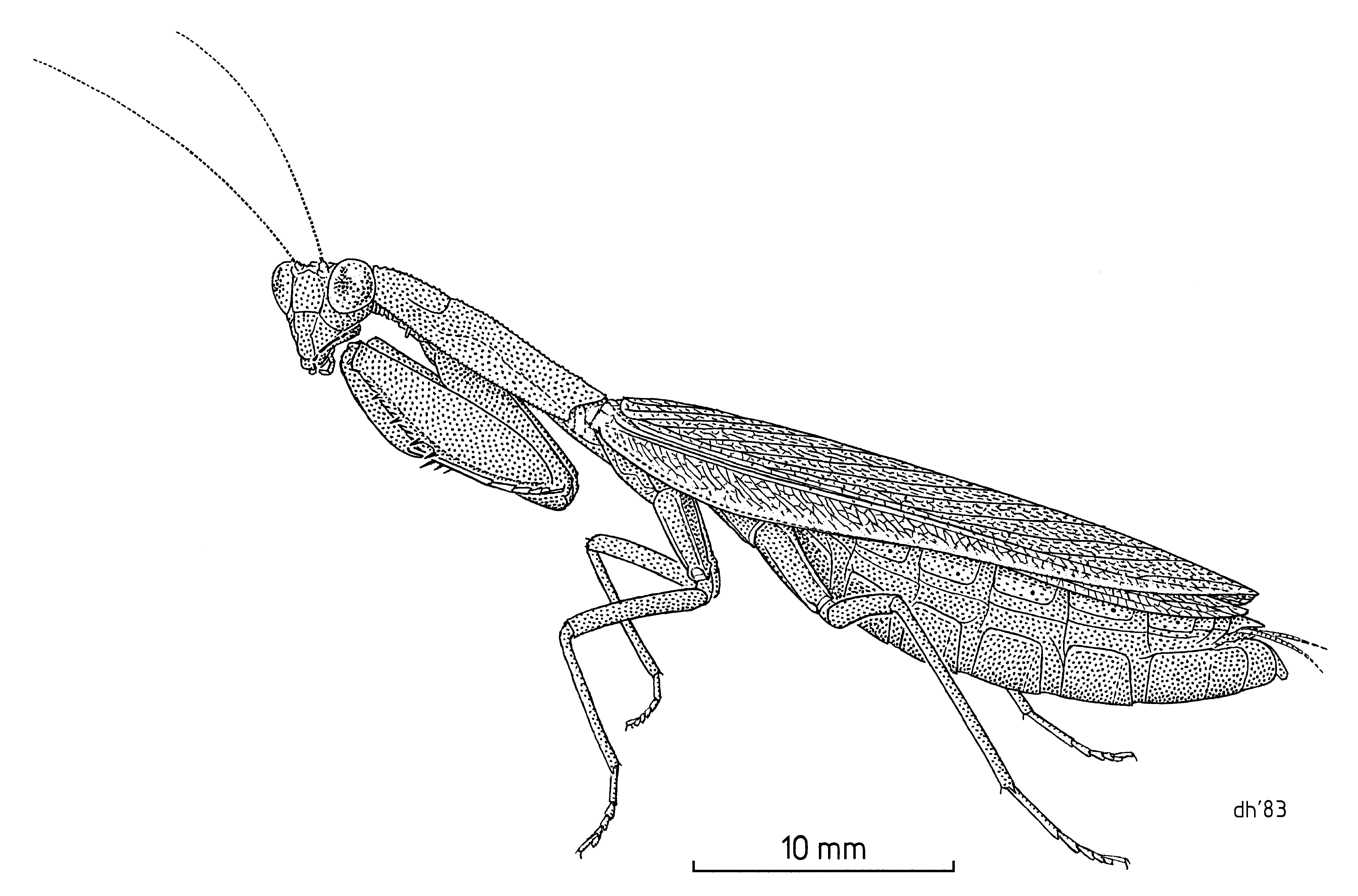
New Zealand praying mantis illustration by Des Helmore

== Cultivation ==
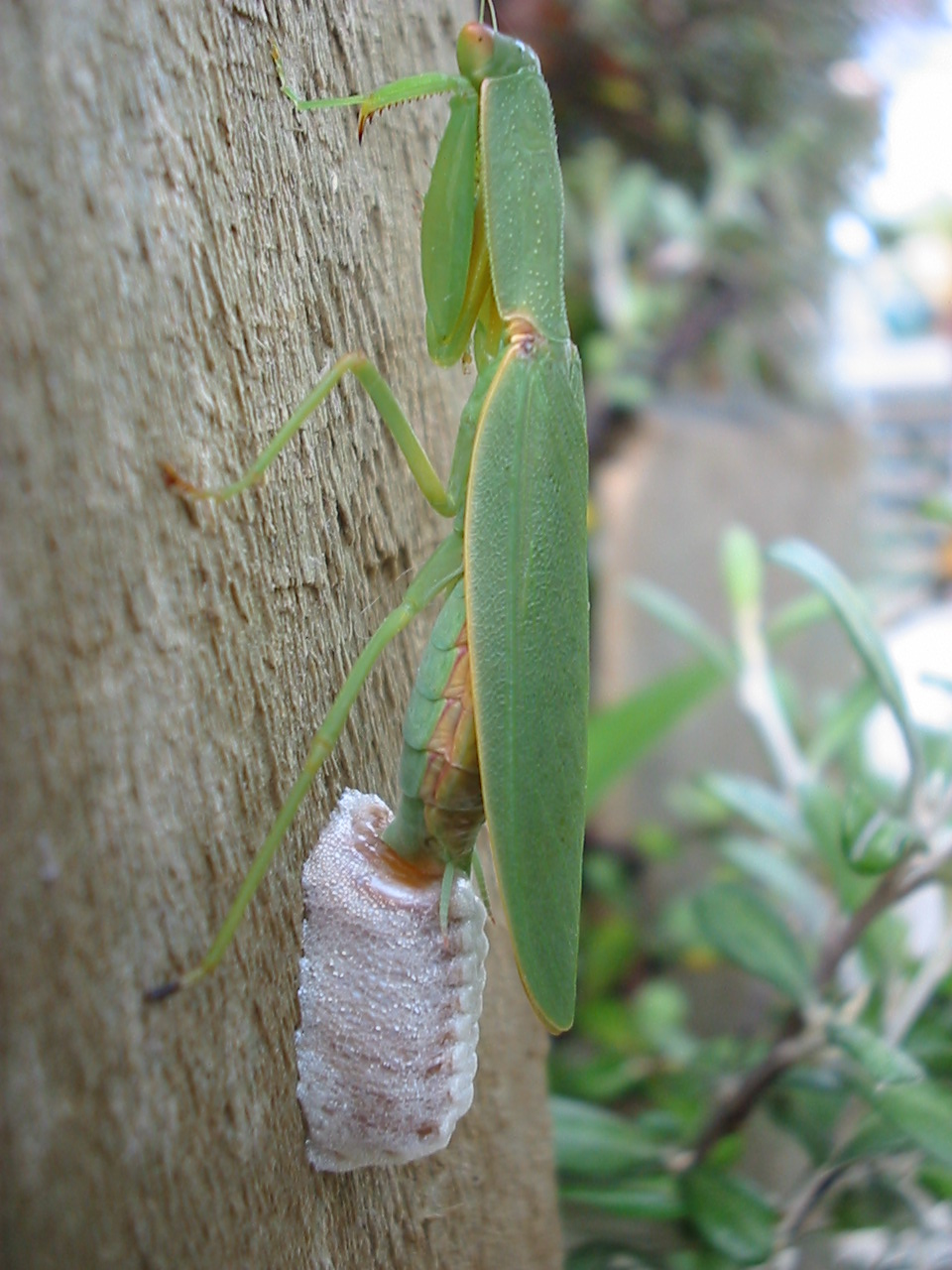
Laying eggs

The New Zealand mantis is bred in captivity. Special care must be taken to prevent this small, quick-moving species from escaping. Nymphs are especially fast and can leap relatively far as well. It can be kept at room temperature (20–25 °C or 68–77 °F) but does prefer warmth. Their enclosure should be sprayed with water a few times a week, and when they are young their enclosure should be kept at around 50%–60% humidity. Captive O. novaezealandiae can be fed on a diet of small crickets and flies. Nymphs can be reared easily on fruitflies such as Drosophila melanogaster.

== See also ==
- List of mantis genera and species
