= S. fenestrata =

S. fenestrata may refer to:

- Sphodromantis fenestrata, a praying mantis species found in Ethiopia, Kenya, Somalia, Sudan and Tanzania
- Symplecta fenestrata, de Meijere, 1913, a crane fly species in the genus Symplecta

== See also ==
- Sphinx fenestrata, a synonym for Amata polymita, the tiger-striped clearwing moth species
- Fenestrata (disambiguation)
