= Sphodromantis lagrecai =

Scientific classification
- Kingdom: Animalia
- Phylum: Arthropoda
- Clade: Pancrustacea
- Class: Insecta
- Order: Mantodea
- Family: Mantidae
- Genus: Sphodromantis
- Species: S. lagrecai

Binomial name
- Sphodromantis lagrecai Lombardo, 1989

Species of praying mantis

Sphodromantis lagrecai is a species of praying mantis found in Kenya, Tanzania, and Uganda.

== See also ==
- African mantis
- List of mantis genera and species
