= Sphodromantis elegans =

Scientific classification
- Kingdom: Animalia
- Phylum: Arthropoda
- Clade: Pancrustacea
- Class: Insecta
- Order: Mantodea
- Family: Mantidae
- Genus: Sphodromantis
- Species: S. elegans

Binomial name
- Sphodromantis elegans Sjöstedt, 1930

Species of praying mantis

Sphodromantis elegans is a species of praying mantis found in Ethiopia, Burkina Faso, Guinea, Mauritania, Niger, Senegal and the Congo River region.

== See also ==
- African mantis
- List of mantis genera and species
