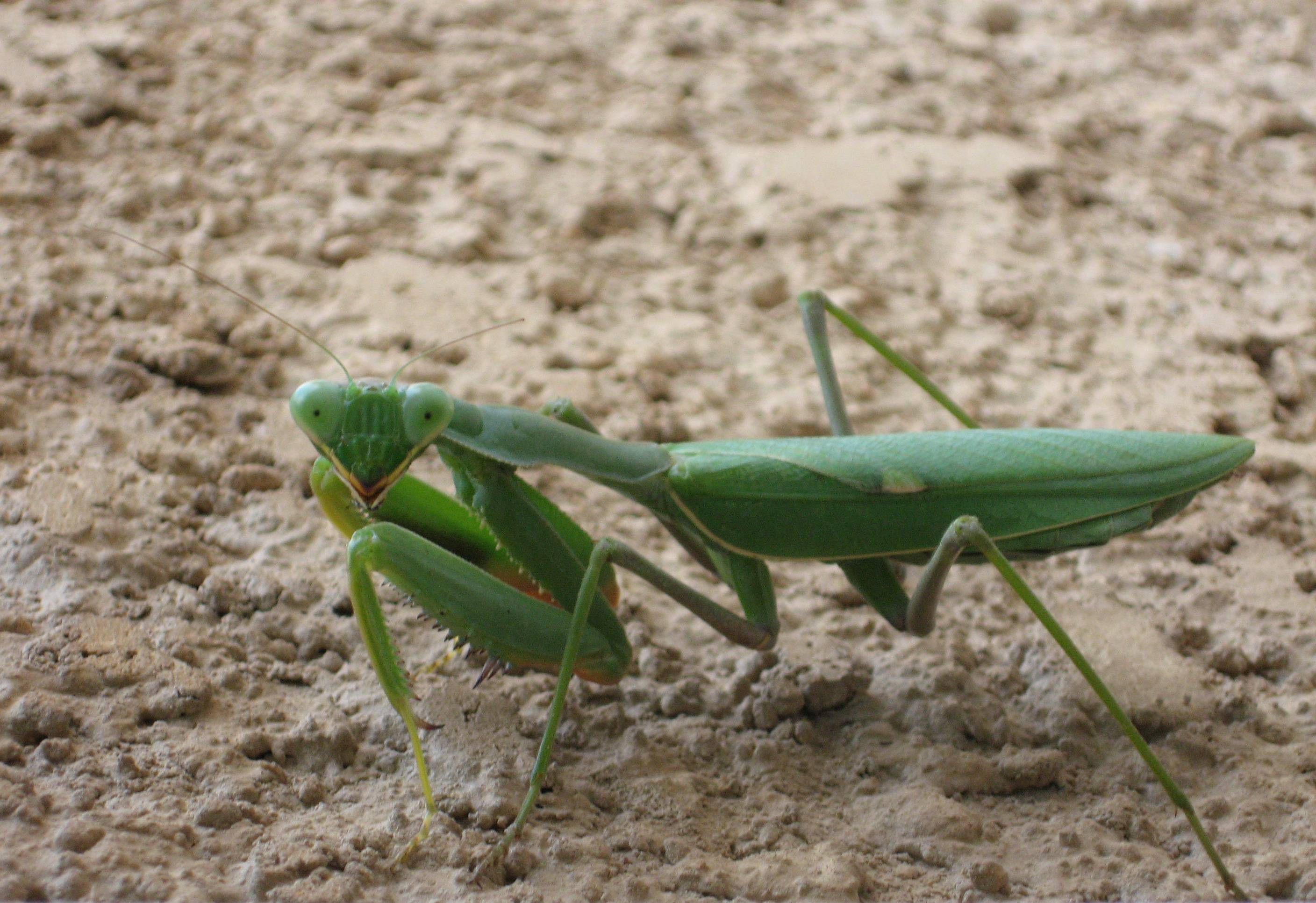
- Adult female Sphodromantis viridis

Scientific classification
- Kingdom: Animalia
- Phylum: Arthropoda
- Clade: Pancrustacea
- Class: Insecta
- Order: Mantodea
- Family: Mantidae
- Tribe: Paramantini
- Genus: Sphodromantis; Stål, 1871

Species
- See text.

= Sphodromantis =

Genus of praying mantises

Sphodromantis is a large genus of praying mantises concentrated in Africa, sometimes considered a synonym of the genus Hierodula: from the same family, Mantidae. Outside their range especially, many share the common name African Mantis.

== Species ==
The following species are recognised in the genus Sphodromantis:

- Sphodromantis abessinica Sjöstedt, 1930
- Sphodromantis aethiopica La Greca & Lombardo, 1987
- Sphodromantis annobonensis Llorente, 1968
- Sphodromantis aurea Giglio-Tos, 1917 (Congo Green Mantis)
- Sphodromantis aureoides Roy, 2010
- Sphodromantis baccettii La Greca & Lombardo, 1987 (Giant African Praying Mantis)
- Sphodromantis balachowskyi La Greca, 1967 (African Mantis, African Praying Mantis)
- Sphodromantis biocellata Werner, 1906
- Sphodromantis centralis Rehn, 1914 (African Mantis, Central African Mantis)
- Sphodromantis citernii Giglio-Tos, 1917
- Sphodromantis congica Beier, 1931 (Congo Mantis)
- Sphodromantis conspicua La Greca, 1967
- Sphodromantis elegans Sjöstedt, 1930
- Sphodromantis elongata La Greca, 1969
- Sphodromantis fenestrata Giglio-Tos, 1912
- Sphodromantis gastrica Stal, 1858 (Common Green Mantis, African Mantis)
- Sphodromantis gestri Giglio-Tos, 1912
- Sphodromantis giubana La Greca & Lombardo, 1987
- Sphodromantis gracilicollis Beier, 1930
- Sphodromantis gracilis Lombardo, 1992
- Sphodromantis hyalina La Greca, 1955
- Sphodromantis kersteni Gerstaecker, 1869
- Sphodromantis lagrecai Lombardo, 1990
- Sphodromantis lineola Burmeister, 1838 (African Praying Mantis, African Mantis, Giant African Mantis, African Lined Mantis)
- Sphodromantis obscura Beier & Hocking, 1965
- Sphodromantis pachinota La Greca & Lombardo, 1987
- Sphodromantis pardii La Greca & Lombardo, 1987
- Sphodromantis pavonina La Greca, 1956
- Sphodromantis pupillata Bolivar, 1912
- Sphodromantis royi La Greca, 1967
- Sphodromantis rubrostigma Werner, 1916
- Sphodromantis rudolfae Rehn, 1901
- Sphodromantis socotrana (Roy, 2010)
- Sphodromantis splendida Hebard, 1920
- Sphodromantis stigmosa (Roy, 2010)
- Sphodromantis tenuidentata Lombardo, 1992
- Sphodromantis viridis Forskål, 1775 (Giant African Mantis)
- Sphodromantis werneri (Roy, 2010)

== As pets ==
Due to their large size and vibrant coloration compared to other mantids, Sphodromantis species are very common in the pet trade. List of Sphodromantis species that have been bred and raised in captivity.

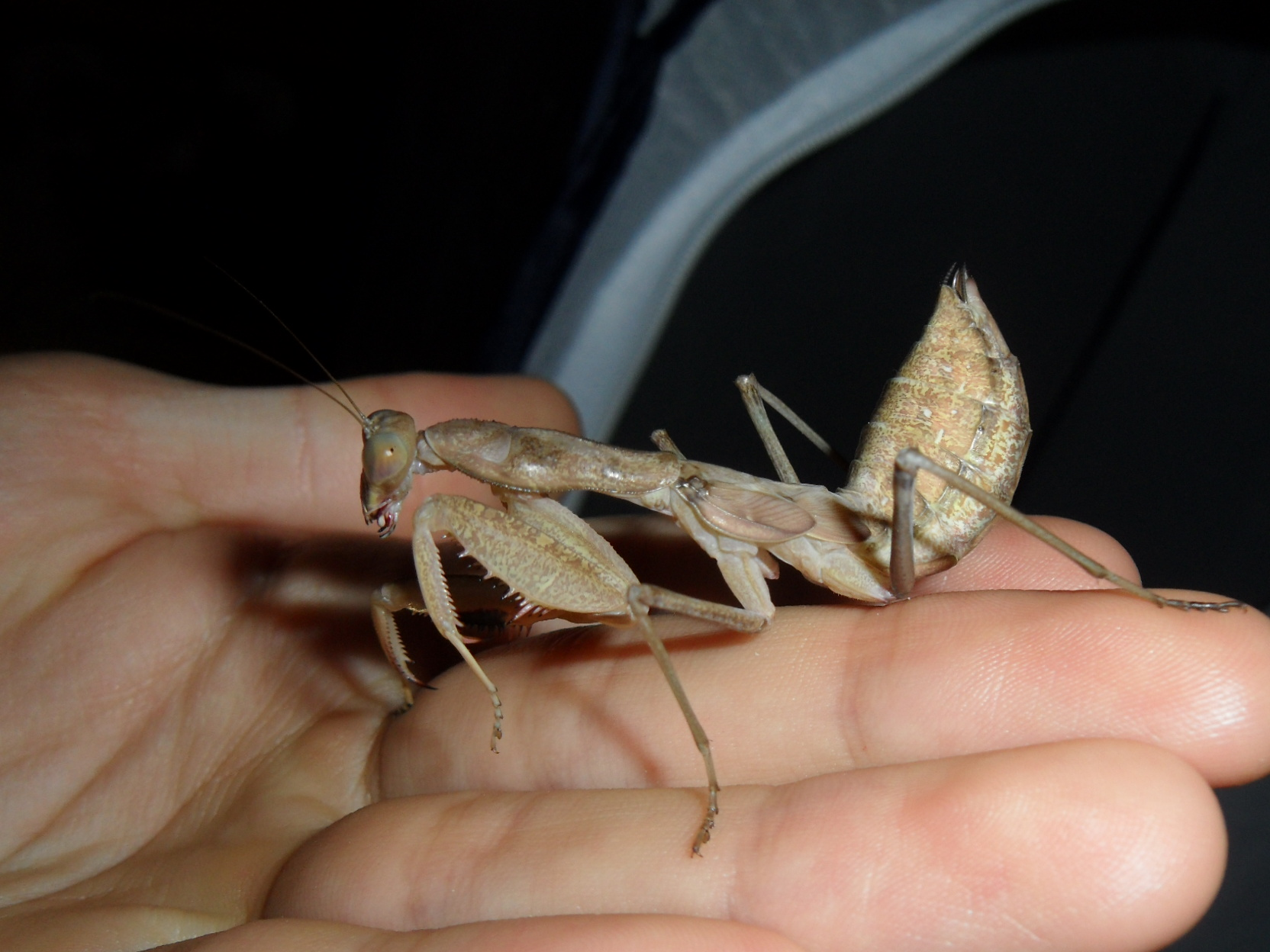
Brown sub-adult female Sphodromantis sp. "Blue Flash"

- Sphodromantis aurea (Congo Green Mantis)
- Sphodromantis baccettii (Giant African Praying Mantis)
- Sphodromantis gastrica (Common Green Mantis, African Mantis)
- Sphodromantis lineola (African Praying Mantis, African Mantis, Giant African Mantis, African Lined Mantis)
- Sphodromantis viridis (Giant African Mantis)
- Sphodromantis sp. "Blue Flash" (An unknown species of Sphodromantis that comes from the Congo and are popular in the pet trade. They are also called Sphodromantis sp. "Congo Blue Flash", Congo Blue Flash or just Blue Flash.)

== See also ==
- List of mantis genera and species
