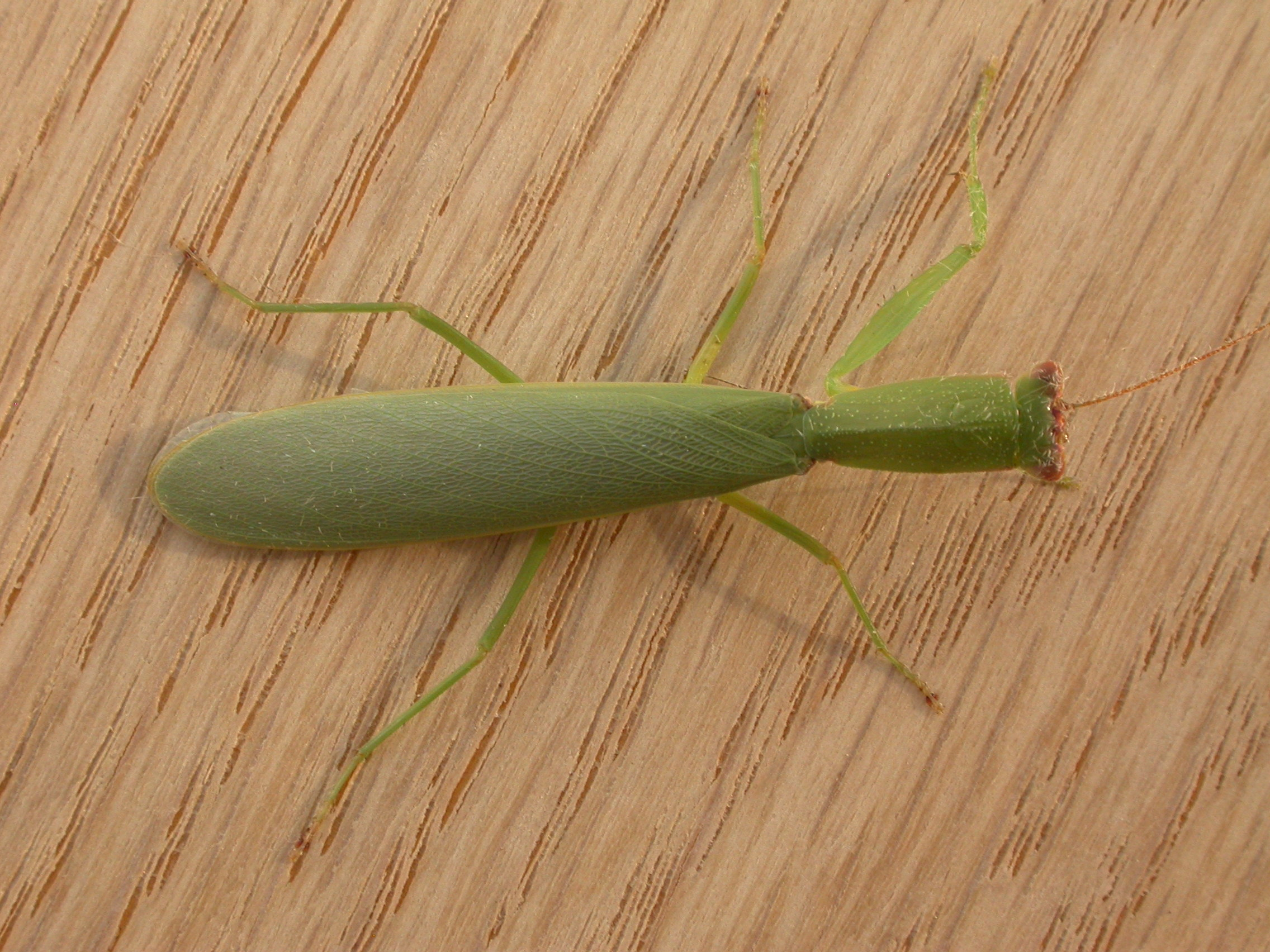
- Orthodera ministralis

Scientific classification
- Kingdom: Animalia
- Phylum: Arthropoda
- Clade: Pancrustacea
- Class: Insecta
- Order: Mantodea
- Family: Mantidae
- Subfamily: Orthoderinae
- Genus: Orthodera (Burmeister, 1838)

Species
- See text

= Orthodera =

Genus of praying mantises

Orthodera is a genus of praying mantises that can be found in Australia and Southeast Asia, with one species (Orthodera novaezealandiae) said to be the only native species of mantis of New Zealand.

== Species ==
- Orthodera australiana Giglio-Tos, 1917 Australia, New Zealand?
- Orthodera burmeisteri Wood-Mason, 1889 Australia, New Zealand?, New Guinea, Micronesia
- Orthodera gracilis Giglio-Tos, 1917 Australia
- Orthodera gunnii Le Guillou, 1841 Australia, Tasmania
- Orthodera insularis Beier, 1952 Sumba
- Orthodera ministralis Fabricius, 1775 (garden mantis) Australia, New Zealand, Hawaii
- Orthodera novaezealandiae Colenso, 1882 (New Zealand mantis) New Zealand
- Orthodera rubrocoxata Serville, 1839 Australia
- Orthodera timorensis Werner, 1933 Timor

== See also ==
- List of mantis genera and species
