= Sphodromantis fenestrata =

Scientific classification
- Kingdom: Animalia
- Phylum: Arthropoda
- Clade: Pancrustacea
- Class: Insecta
- Order: Mantodea
- Family: Mantidae
- Genus: Sphodromantis
- Species: S. fenestrata

Binomial name
- Sphodromantis fenestrata Giglio-Tos, 1912

Synonyms
- Sphodromantis fulva Giglio-Tos, 1912; Sphodromantis uebina Giglio-Tos, 1912

Species of praying mantis

Sphodromantis fenestrata is a species of praying mantis found in Ethiopia, Kenya, Somalia, Sudan, and Tanzania.

== See also ==
- African mantis
- List of mantis genera and species
