= Orthodera rubrocoxata =

Scientific classification
- Domain: Eukaryota
- Kingdom: Animalia
- Phylum: Arthropoda
- Class: Insecta
- Order: Mantodea
- Family: Mantidae
- Genus: Orthodera
- Species: O. rubrocoxata

Binomial name
- Orthodera rubrocoxata Serville 1839

Synonyms
- Orthodera hobsoni Le Guillou, 1841; Orthodera laticollis Brancsik, 1895

Species of praying mantis

Orthodera rubrocoxata is a species of praying mantis found in Australia.

== See also ==
- List of mantis genera and species
