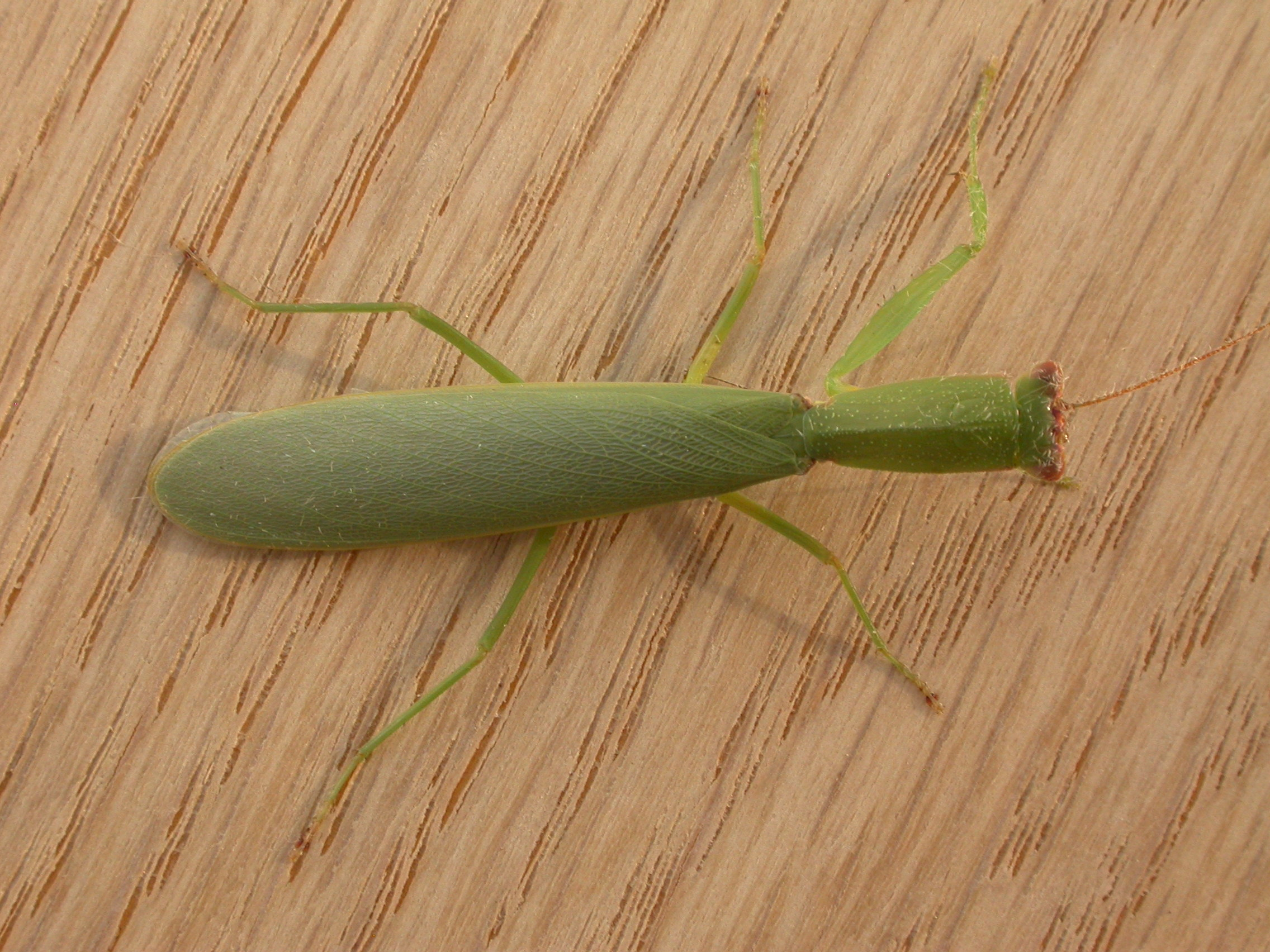

Scientific classification
- Kingdom: Animalia
- Phylum: Arthropoda
- Clade: Pancrustacea
- Class: Insecta
- Order: Mantodea
- Family: Mantidae
- Genus: Orthodera
- Species: O. ministralis

Binomial name
- Orthodera ministralis (Fabricius, 1775)

Synonyms
- Orthodera prasina Burmeister, 1838

= Orthodera ministralis =

Species of praying mantis

Orthodera ministralis, common name garden mantis or Australian green mantis, is a species of praying mantis from Australia.

== Description ==
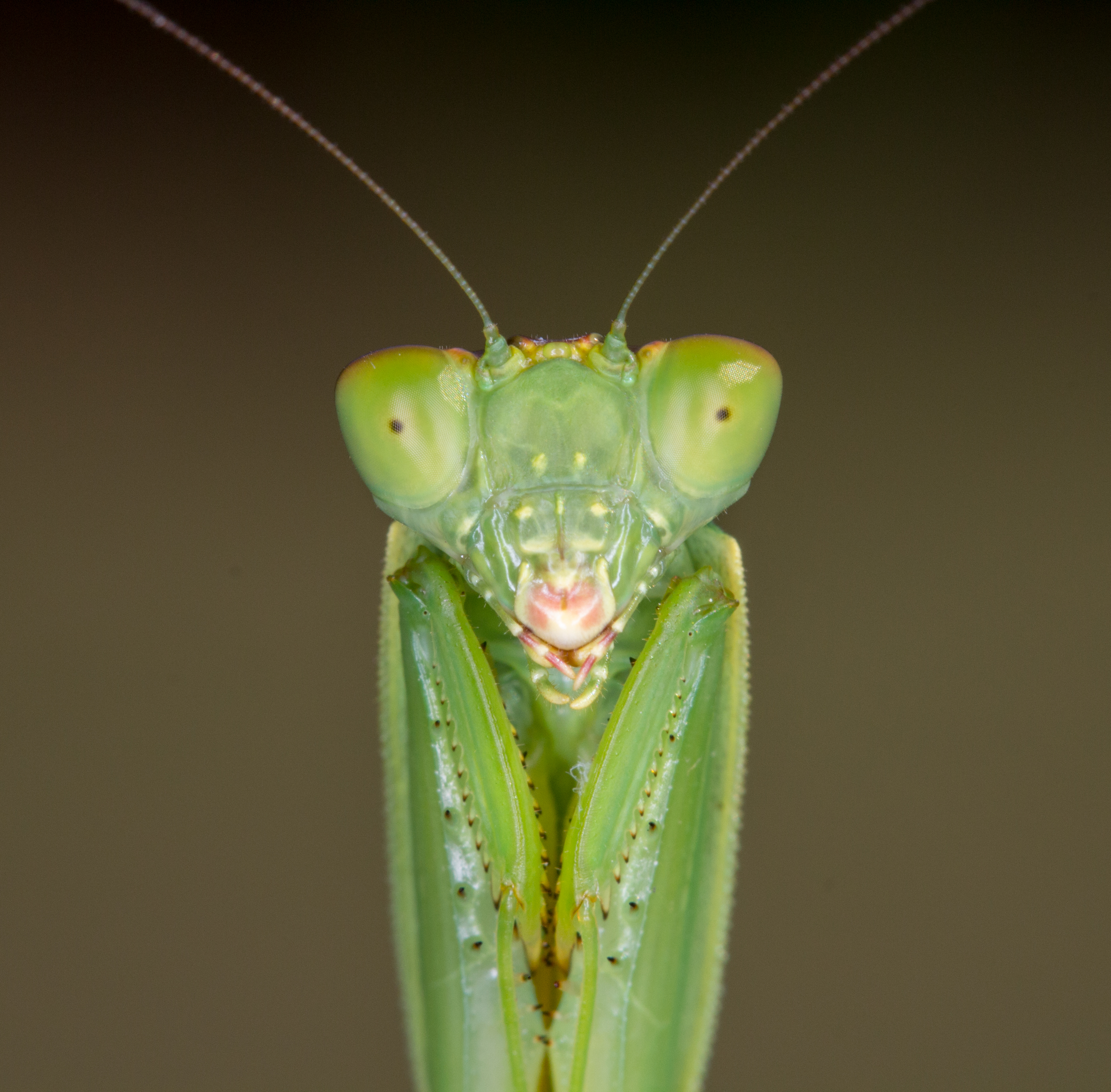
Head shot

They have a green body with their thorax being broader than their head and abdomen. Inside of their front legs have a blue to purple spot. Adult males have longer wings than females. Body measures up to 4 cm in length.

== Habitat ==
The garden mantis inhabits the whole of Australia, particularly gardens, and can often be found hidden in leafy scrub from ground to eye level. It feeds on small insects by ambushing them. They remain motionless for lengthy periods so they can ambush prey as it moves near them. The females lay eggs as a single mass within a sturdy, woody case.

== See also ==
- List of mantis genera and species
