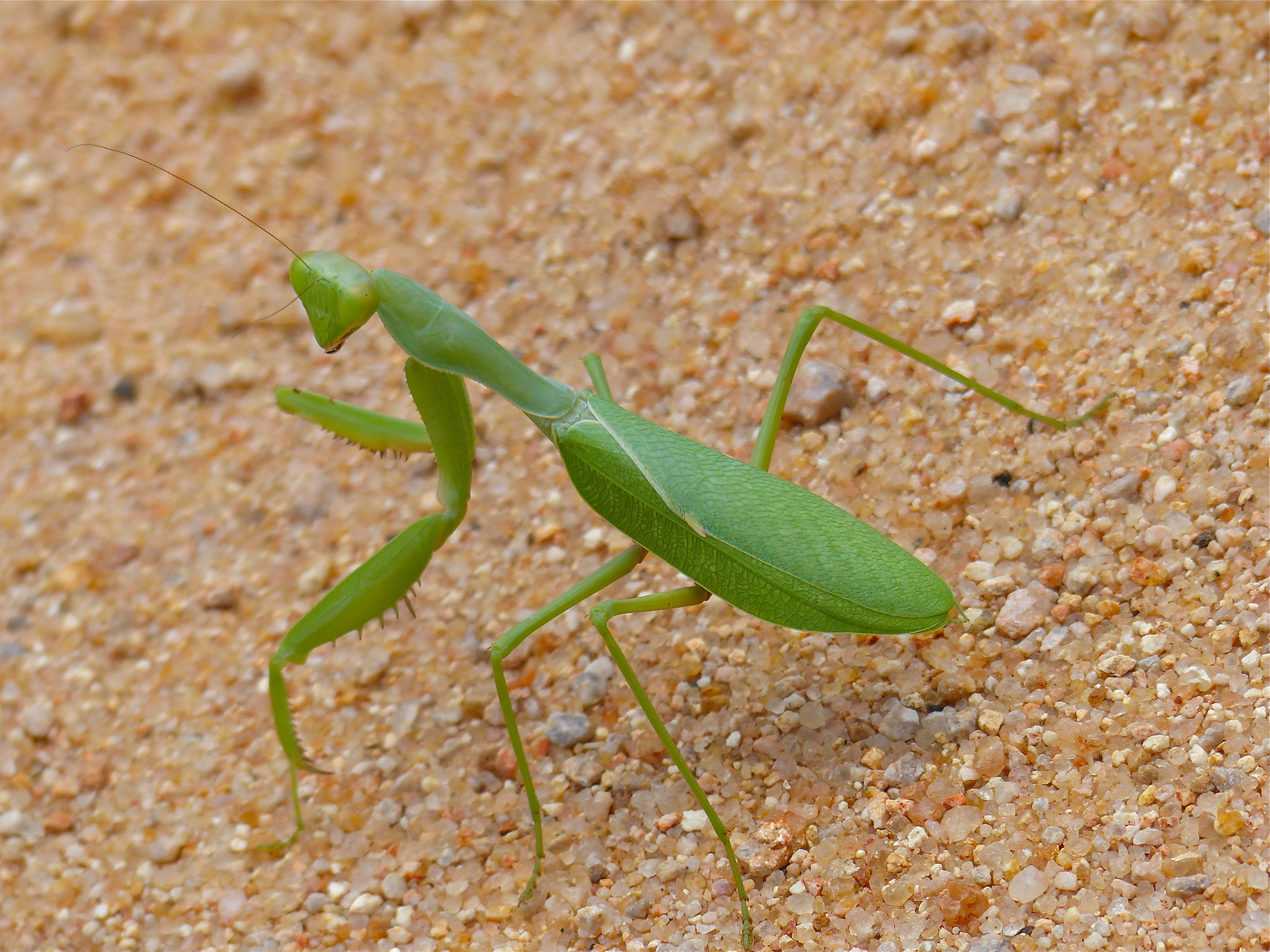
- Adult in the Kruger Park, South Africa

Scientific classification
- Kingdom: Animalia
- Phylum: Arthropoda
- Clade: Pancrustacea
- Class: Insecta
- Order: Mantodea
- Family: Mantidae
- Genus: Sphodromantis
- Species: S. gastrica

Binomial name
- Sphodromantis gastrica (Stål, 1858)

Synonyms
- Mantis gastrica Stål 1858; Hierodula bicarinata (Saussure, 1869); Sphodromantis bicarinata (Saussure, 1869); Sphodromantis bioculata (Burmeister, 1838); Sphodromantis occidentalis (Werner, 1906)

= Sphodromantis gastrica =

African mantis

Species of praying mantis

Sphodromantis gastrica, with the common names African mantis or common green mantis, is a species of praying mantis from Africa.

It averages 65–75 millimetres (2.6–3.0 in) in body length, and has a very diverse diet, hunting any prey of reasonable size. It has a lifespan of approximately 332 days and usually females live longer than males. Their survival rate until adulthood is about 41.8%.

Previously classified as Hierodula bicarinata (Saussure, 1869) and as Sphodromantis guttata (Giglio-Tos, 1907), this species has been found in South Africa, Namibia, Botswana, Zimbabwe, Zambia, Democratic Republic of Congo, and East Africa.

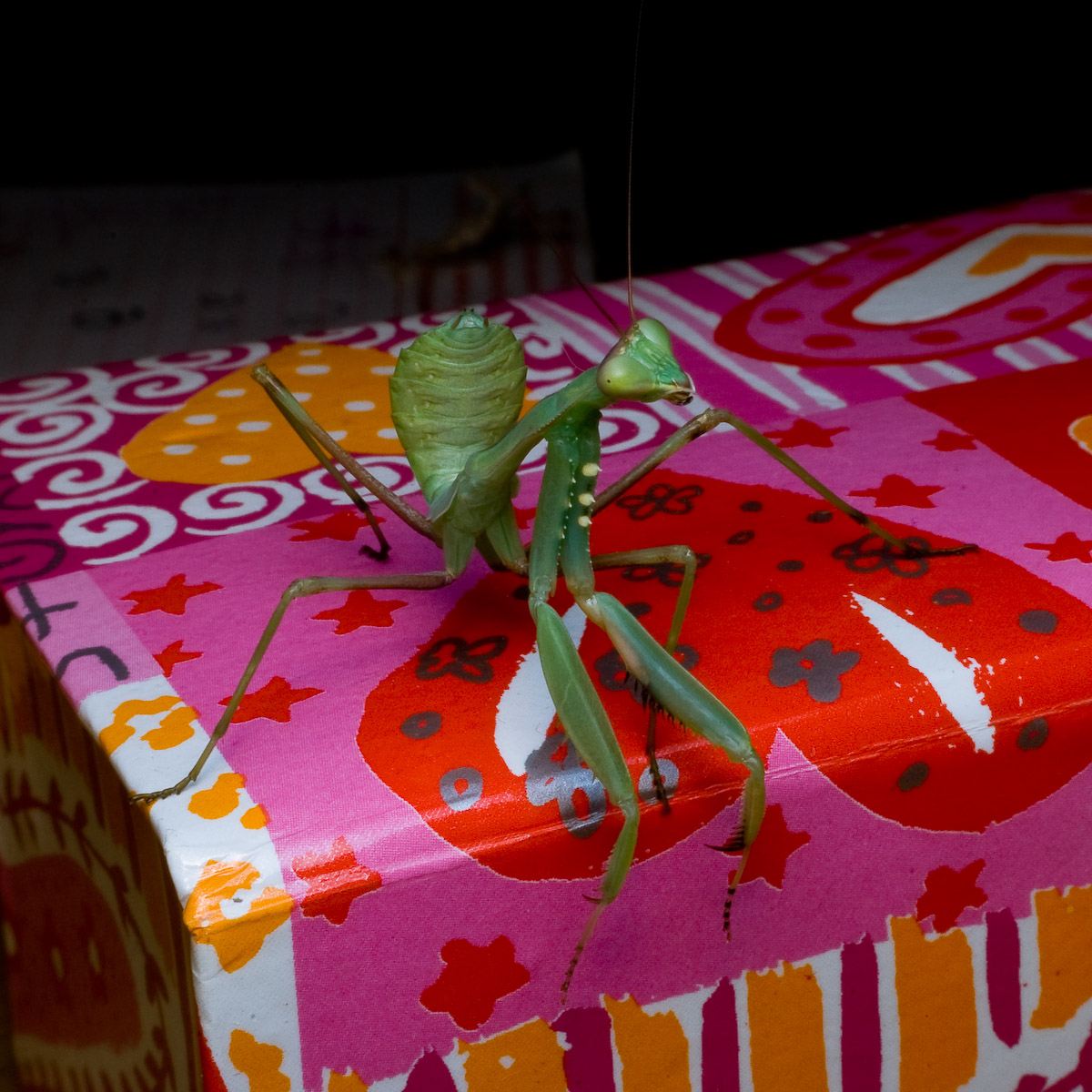
Immature female

== See also ==
- African mantis
- List of mantis genera and species
