= Sphodromantis belachowski =

Scientific classification
- Kingdom: Animalia
- Phylum: Arthropoda
- Clade: Pancrustacea
- Class: Insecta
- Order: Mantodea
- Family: Mantidae
- Genus: Sphodromantis
- Species: S. belachowski

Binomial name
- Sphodromantis belachowski La Greca, 1967

Species of praying mantis

Sphodromantis belachowski, common name African mantis or African praying mantis, is a species of praying mantis from Africa.

== See also ==
- African mantis
- List of mantis genera and species
