= Sphodromantis centralis =

Scientific classification
- Kingdom: Animalia
- Phylum: Arthropoda
- Clade: Pancrustacea
- Class: Insecta
- Order: Mantodea
- Family: Mantidae
- Genus: Sphodromantis
- Species: S. centralis

Binomial name
- Sphodromantis centralis Rehn, 1914

Species of praying mantis

Sphodromantis centralis, common name African mantis or Central African mantis, is a species of praying mantis from Africa.

== See also ==
- African mantis
- List of mantis genera and species
