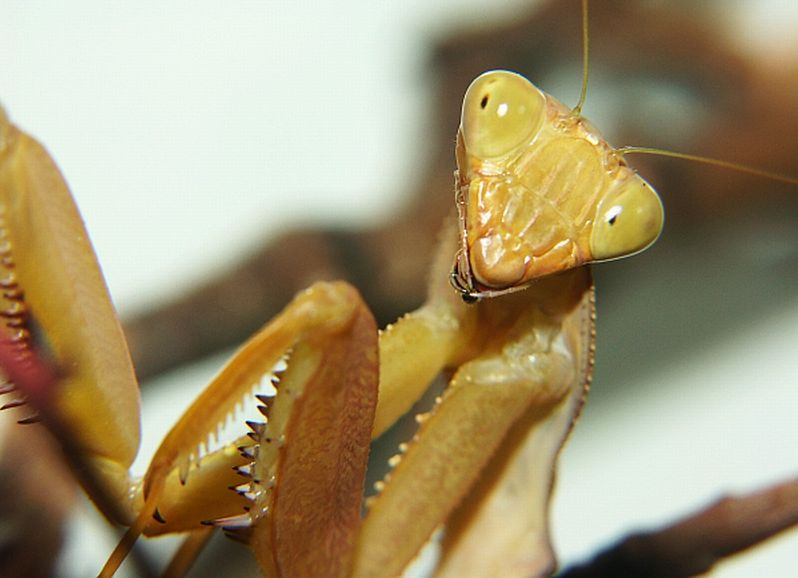

Scientific classification
- Kingdom: Animalia
- Phylum: Arthropoda
- Clade: Pancrustacea
- Class: Insecta
- Order: Mantodea
- Family: Mantidae
- Genus: Sphodromantis
- Species: S. lineola

Binomial name
- Sphodromantis lineola (Burmeister, 1838)

= Sphodromantis lineola =

Species of praying mantis

Sphodromantis lineola, common name African mantis or African praying mantis, is a species of praying mantis native to the continent of Africa sometimes raised in captivity. S. lineola is often colored green, however they can also be colored different types of brown. The brown colored individuals have also been observed with purple colored eyes. It may be distinguished from S. baccettii by the absence of blue-black spots on its forearms.

== Visual System ==
The visual system of the S. lineola is the most studied aspect of this species. In fact, this species is the most studied in this topic. Since S. lineola are sit and wait predators they have a well developed motion detection visual system. This species of mantis like most other species have apposition based compound eyes and mantises are the only invertebrates known to use stereoscopic vision. They use looming signals in order to detect and calculate other organisms or objects heading towards them using motion-in-depth perception. Using this system they are able to calculate based on speed whether to resort to predatory or defensive strikes. They have also demonstrated to respond to visual cues which are not of their usual prey or that they have ever encountered which complements their larger range of prey due to scarcity in nature. However some studies do denote that there is no evidence of this species being able to judge the size of their prey and mostly just focus on their depth, which can probably be connected to their generalist predatory behavior.

== Predation ==
Much Like the rest of the mantids they are mainly insectivores preying on other insects. However, Mantids are also known to be able to capture and feed on vertebrates. These ferocious predators are not picky predators and are very opportunistic. This is due to the fact that in nature prey is scarce and are often in a state of hunger. Hence, why female mantids including this species will resort to post mating cannibalism to supplement the energy and nutrition needed to survive and reproduce. Like most praying mantis this species is an ambush predator. They use their well developed motion detection visual systems as well as proprioceptive information to detect prey and then deliver a carefully calculated and extremely accurate strike.

== Reproduction ==
=== Mate Attraction ===
Males are mainly attracted to females through olfactory and visual signals as well as with tactile cues. Studies have shown that hormones alone are not responsible for attraction of males by females. Females must perform mainly specific antennal movements as a premating behavior along with hormones in order to attract the attention of the males.

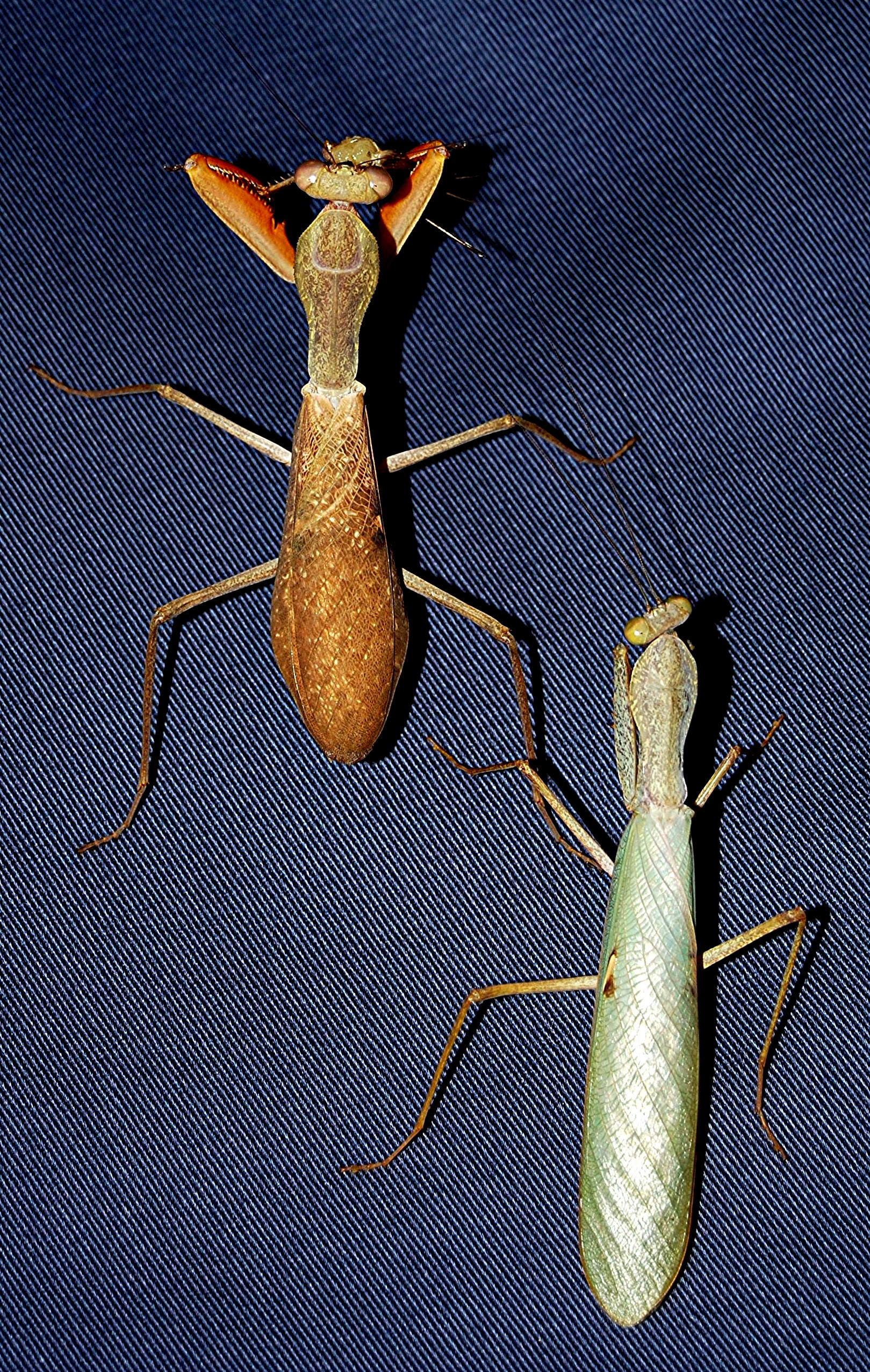

=== Sexual Cannibalism ===
Many mantid species are known to show cannibalism post copulation, S. lineola being one of these species. Studies have come to the conclusion that this behavior can be attributed female mantids needing nutrition in order to produce more offspring. It has been documented that females of this species are commonly in a state of hunger in natural settings which is shown to be a driver of this behavior. In captivity, under circumstances in which females are well fed, they have been shown to not perform cannibalism on the male mantid after copulation. Other ways for males to avoid being eaten by their mate is through different courtship behaviors such as sneaking on the female or swiftly jumping on their back whilst trying to avoid being eaten. Although under most natural circumstances these are often ineffective.

== Scientific Relevance ==
Sphodromantis lineola is being used for many different studies, most of which involve its visual system. Their ability to be kept in captivity has allowed them to become a very used species in this field. They have contributed in the field for theories and topics like the flicker effect idea; the effect of invisible noise on insect motion detection; motion-in-depth perception of mantises; reaction to different stimuli; the physiology of the mantis eye and many other studies based around their vision. S. lineola has been shown to have binocular stereopsis. It is one of the most studied species of mantis in this field. Similarly, this has also led to the study of the mechanisms of mantis predatory behaviors and responses to prey. Furthermore, this species has also been used to study the sexual cannibalism behavior seen so often in mantids as well as helping identify the first putative pheromone in a praying mantid.

== Gallery ==
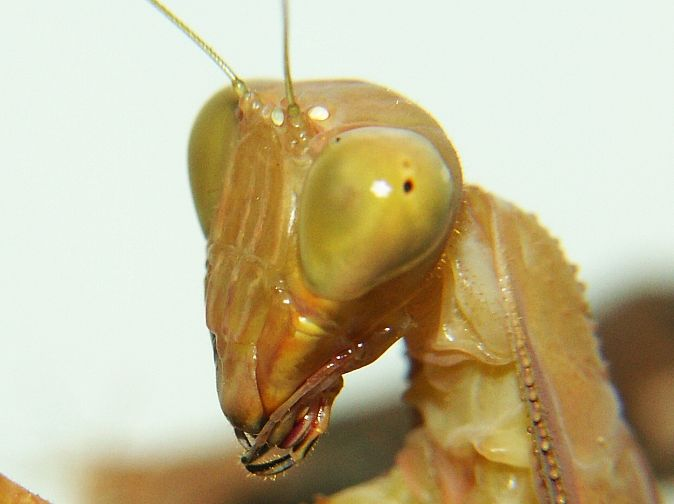
Sphrodomantis lineola

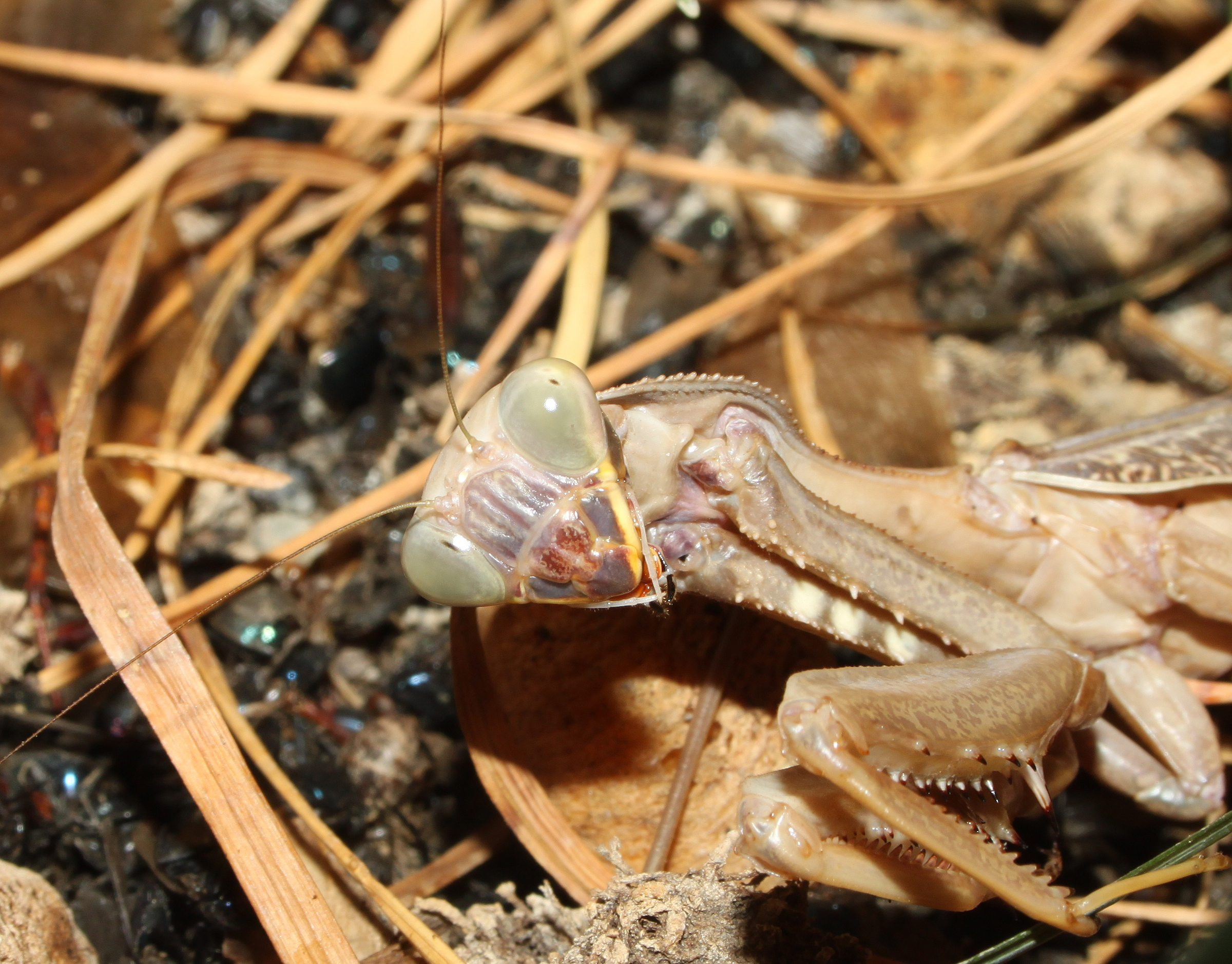
Sphodromantis lineola

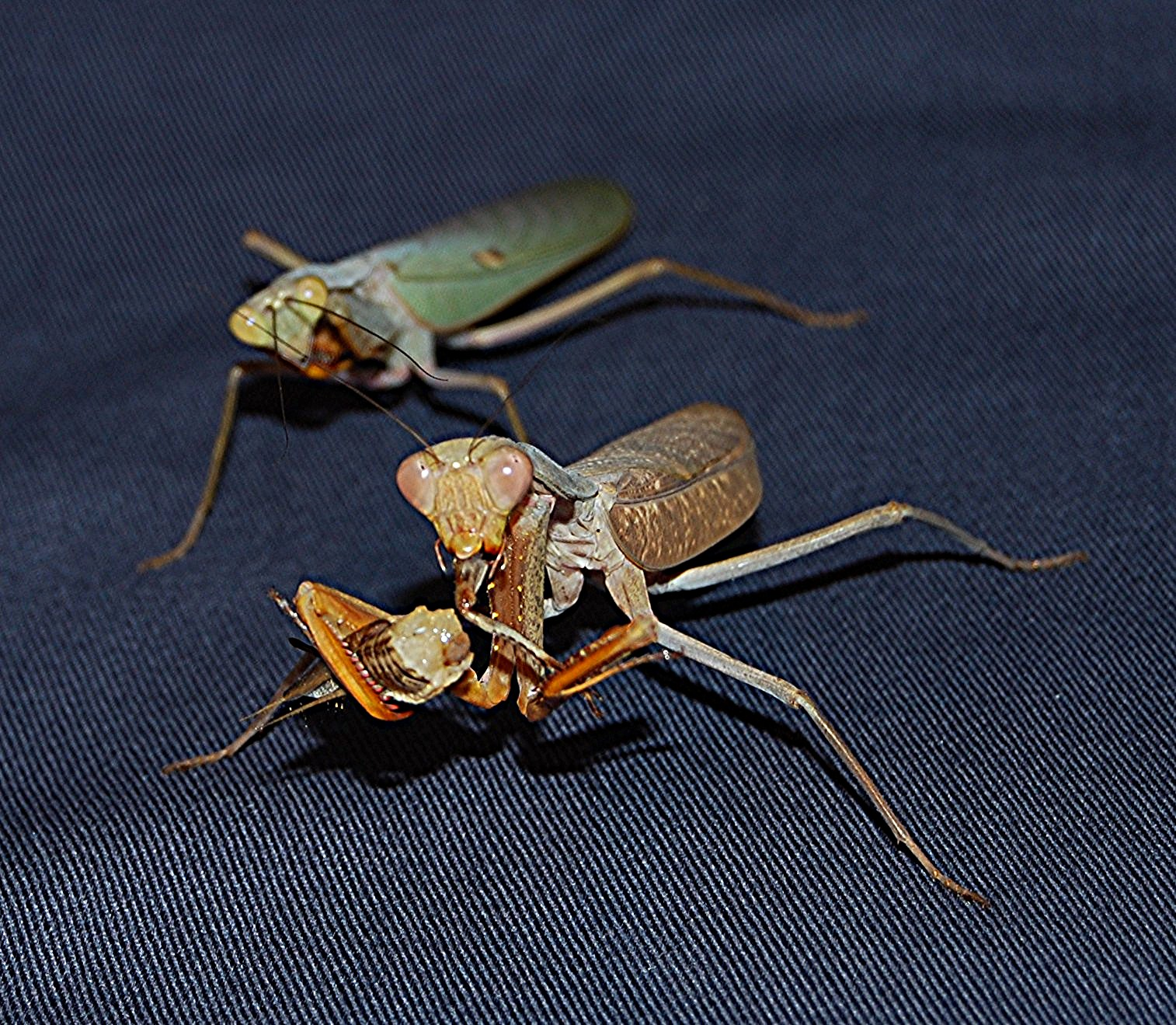
Sphodromantis lineola
