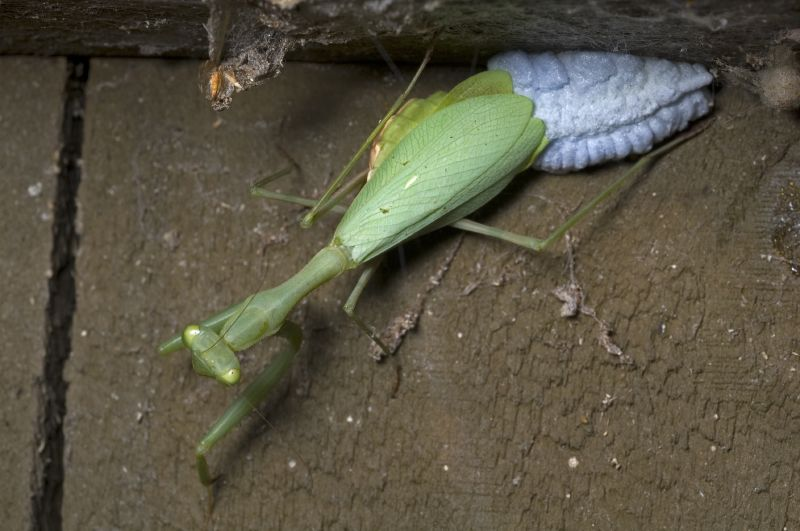
- Laying her egg case

Scientific classification
- Kingdom: Animalia
- Phylum: Arthropoda
- Clade: Pancrustacea
- Class: Insecta
- Order: Mantodea
- Family: Miomantidae
- Genus: Miomantis
- Species: M. caffra

Binomial name
- Miomantis caffra Saussure, 1871

= Miomantis caffra =

Species of praying mantis

Miomantis caffra (common name: springbok mantis) is a species of praying mantis native to Southern Africa. It was first detected in New Zealand in 1978, and was found more recently in Portugal and Los Angeles, USA. Females are facultatively parthenogenetic and unmated females can produce viable offspring.

== Description ==
=== Ootheca ===
The ootheca (egg case) of M. caffra is 12–30 mm long with rounded sides, soft creamy-brown, fawn or beige with a terminal handle-like extension. Hatching is not synchronised, and nymphs may emerge over a period of weeks or even over two seasons. Refrigeration of ootheca in the exotic pet trade can delay their hatching.

The oothecae are extremely hardy, and can survive winter to hatch even in the far south and alpine regions of New Zealand.

=== Nymphs ===
The nymphs are green or brown, body often longitudinally striped, limbs mottled, tip of abdomen curved upwards. Significant colour variation exists in nymphs and sub-adults, with bodies varying from pale straw-colour, bright green, and reddish brown, and legs varying from pale to almost black. Nymphs of M. caffra are cannibalistic, and will attack and eat one-another even in the presence of alternative prey. They do not discriminate against killing their own siblings, and in encounters between two nymphs, the larger usually eats the smaller.

=== Adults ===
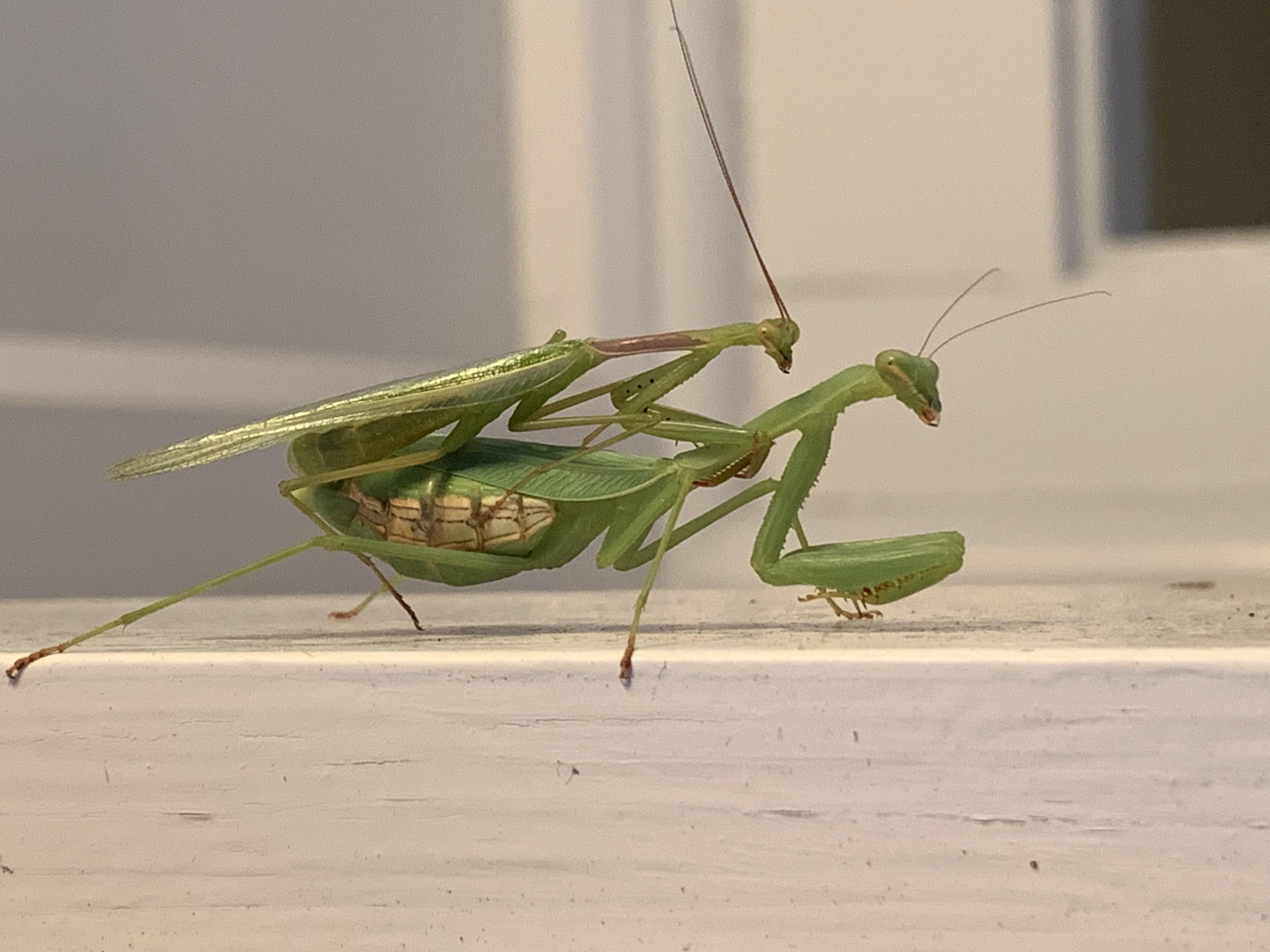
Male (top) female (bottom) Miomantis caffra mating. The abdomen of the female is visibly bulging as she is gravid from a prior mating encounter.

Adults of M. caffra are usually 32–60 mm long, pale green or brown, occasionally with pink or purplish colouration near base of fore-wing; hind wings are green or bright yellow. Pronotum narrower than head, approximately 1/3 of body length, rounded dorsally and swollen over the leg attachment. There are dark pigment spots on the inner surface of the fore-femur. Males are smaller, more slender and have longer antennae than females. The abdomen of an egg-bearing female extends well beyond the wings.

== Behavior ==
In its natural environment, M. caffra tends to hide under leaves. Females of this species exhibit pre-copulatory cannibalism although males are sometimes eaten immediately after copulation.

== Ecology ==
=== Global spread ===
Miomantis caffra was first detected in New Zealand in 1978 and was thought to have arrived as oothecae on plant material or other cargo. In 2014, it was reported in a suburban area of Lisbon, Portugal. Oothecae on cargo and the pet trade were suggested as possible means of arrival. Also in 2014, it was reported on St Helena, where it was noted to be relatively recent arrival and still spreading.

== New Zealand ==
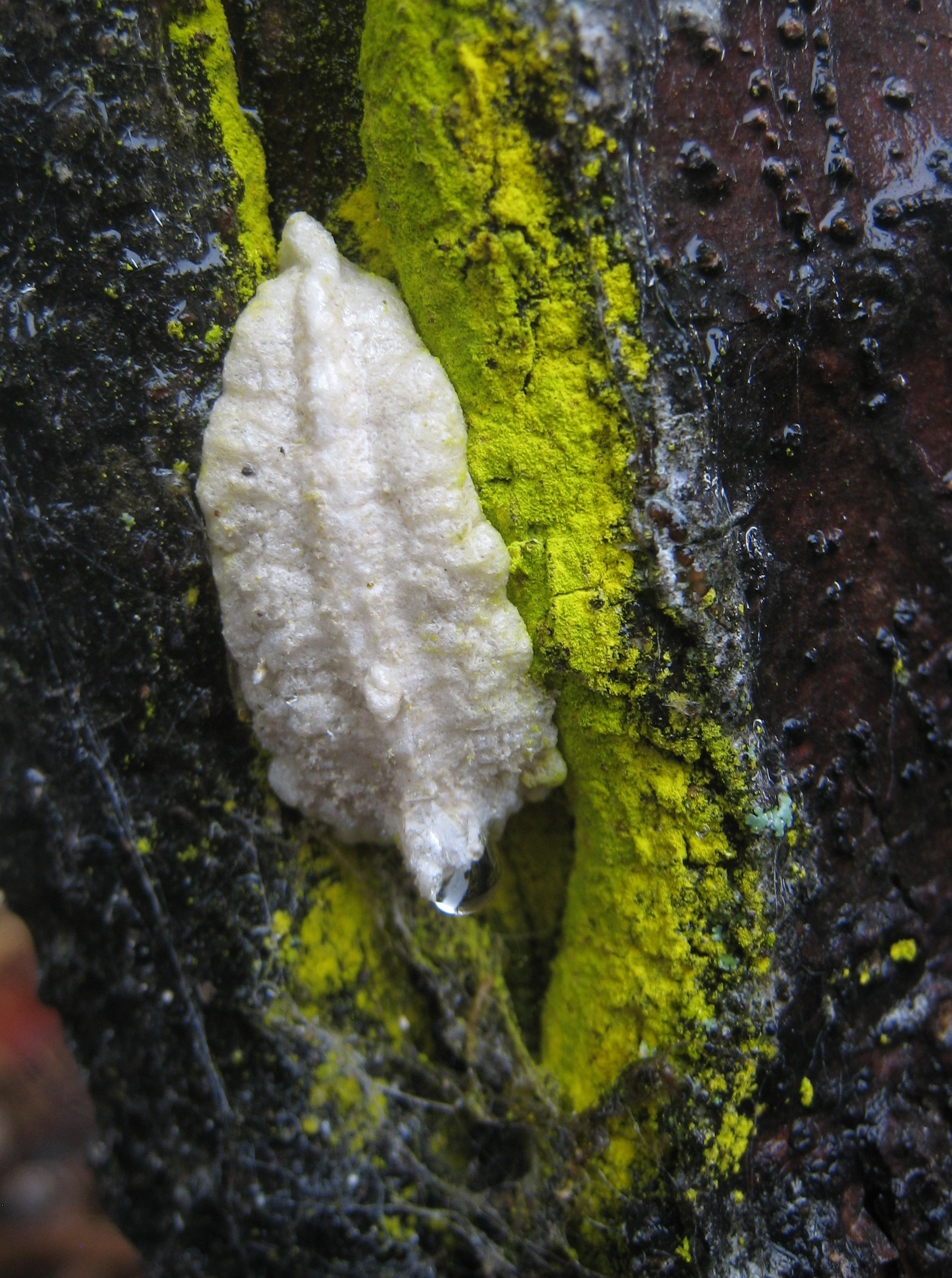
M. caffra egg case in crack

In New Zealand M. caffra is commonly referred to as the springbok mantis or the South African praying mantis. The first specimens to be found in New Zealand were nymphs collected by an Auckland schoolboy at his home in New Lynn, Auckland during February 1978. These were reared to adulthood and a colony based on them was established and maintained by the Entomology Division, DSIR. Initially their identity caused problems as the specimens were unlike any other Australian or Pacific species examined. Finally Dr A. Kaltenbach of the Naturhistorisches Museum, Vienna, identified the specimens as a common Southern African species, Miomantis caffra. Although not considered a pest species, it is thought to be displacing the New Zealand native species (Orthodera novaezealandiae) in urban environments of northern New Zealand. This displacement may be facilitated by the attraction of the native mantis males to females of M. caffra, which often results in their deaths due to sexual cannibalism.

== St Helena ==
On St Helena, M. caffra is listed as a potential threat to indigenous invertebrates. It is one of three invertebrate species considered a priority for research and control.
