= African mantis =

Species of praying mantis

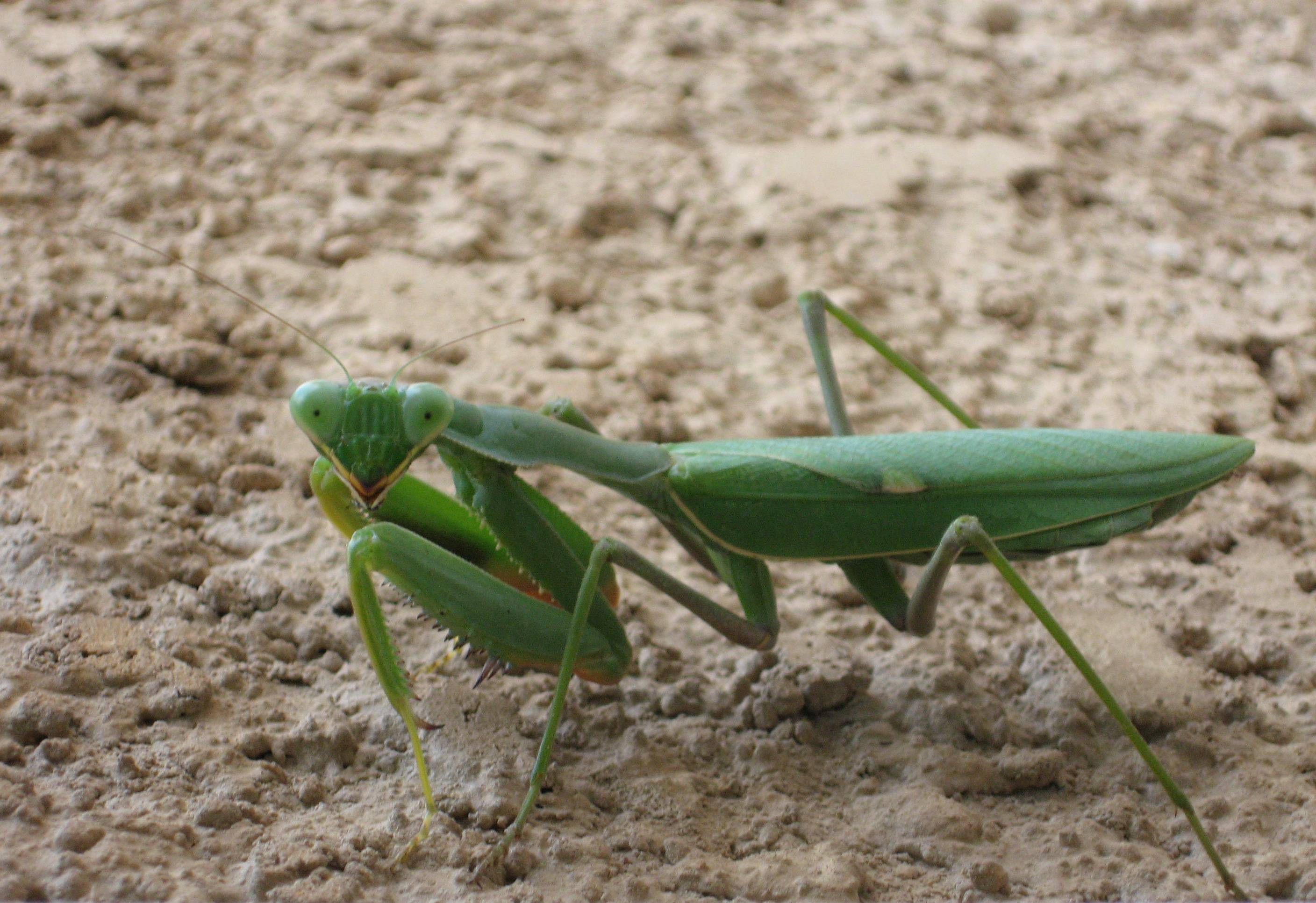
Sphodromantis viridis

African mantis and African praying mantis are common names for many species of praying mantis native to Africa.

The following genera and species are often referred to by these names, by variants of them, or by common names including the name of an African nation:

- Miomantis
  - Miomantis caffra — South African mantis
- Oxyothespis
  - Oxyothespis dumonti — African grass mantis
- Popa
  - Popa spurca — African twig mantis
- Sphodromantis
  - Sphodromantis belachowski
  - Sphodromantis centralis
  - Sphodromantis gastrica
  - Sphodromantis lineola
  - Sphodromantis viridis — Giant African mantis.
- Tarachodes — African bark mantis

== See also ==
- Mantis
- The Mantises of Africa
- List of mantis genera and species
