= Miogryllus convolutus =

Scientific classification
- Domain: Eukaryota
- Kingdom: Animalia
- Phylum: Arthropoda
- Class: Insecta
- Order: Orthoptera
- Suborder: Ensifera
- Family: Gryllidae
- Genus: Miogryllus
- Species: M. convolutus

Binomial name
- Miogryllus convolutus (Johansson, 1763)

Synonyms
- Gryllus convolutus Johansson, 1763; Gryllus ater De Geer, 1773; Gryllus pusillus Burmeister, 1838; Gryllus nitidulus Stål, 1858; Gryllodes micromegas Saussure, 1874; Gryllodes brevipennis Saussure, 1874; Gryllodes parvipennis Saussure, 1874; Nemobius distinguendus Scudder, 1896; Nemobius delicatus Scudder, 1896

Species of cricket

Miogryllus convolutus is a species of cricket from South America.

== Description ==
Miogryllus convolutus exists in a number of forms. Most strikingly, there are micropterous (small-winged) and macropterous (large-winged) forms, but there is also variation in colouration.

== Distribution ==
Miogryllus convolutus has one of the widest geographical distributions of any member of the family Gryllidae in the Americas. It is found in both South and North America, having been recorded from Mexico, Belize, Panama, Costa Rica, Trinidad and Tobago, Guyana, Suriname, French Guiana, Brazil, Ecuador, Peru, Paraguay and Argentina.

== Taxonomic history ==
Miogryllus convolutus was first described (under the name Gryllus convolutus) in Carl Linnaeus' 1763 work Centuria Insectorum, although authorship is often ascribed to Boas Johansson, whose dissertation that work formed. The species' wide geographical distribution, the degree of variation within the species, and the characteristics of the original descriptions have led to a large number of synonyms.
