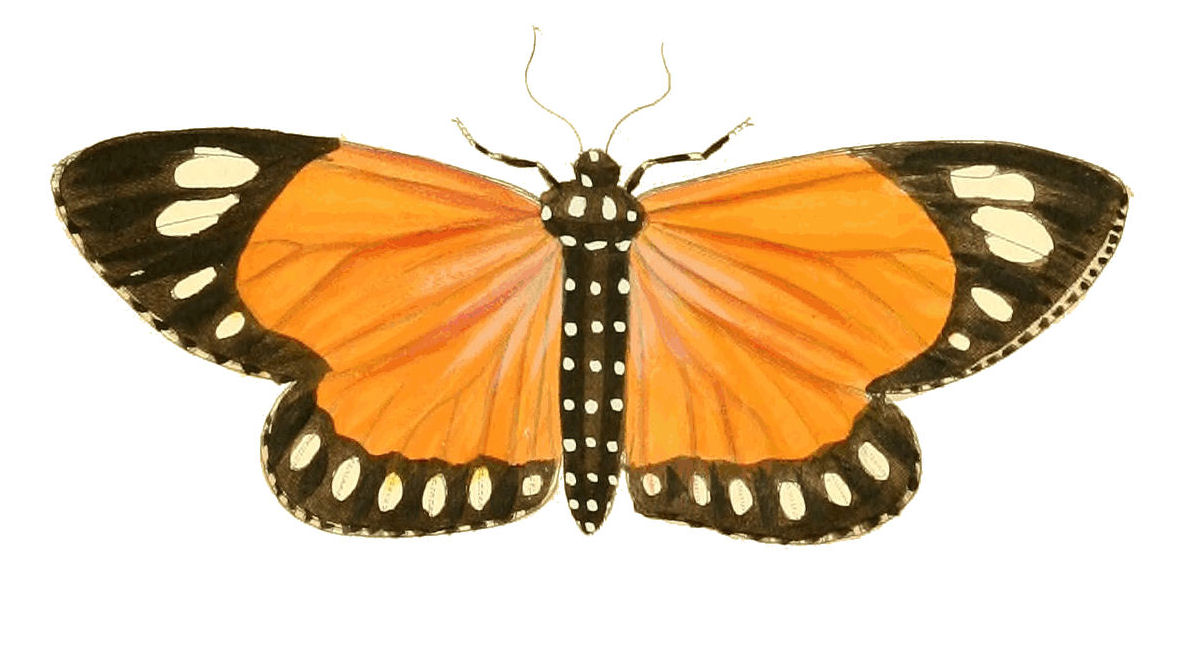
- Illustration by Dru Drury

Scientific classification
- Kingdom: Animalia
- Phylum: Arthropoda
- Class: Insecta
- Order: Lepidoptera
- Family: Geometridae
- Genus: Scopula
- Species: S. helcita

Binomial name
- Scopula helcita (Linnaeus, 1763)

Synonyms
- Papilio (Danaus) helcita Linnaeus, 1763; Aletis helcita; Aletis druryi Butler, 1878; Phalaena fascelis Linnaeus, 1764; Papilio fuscofasciatus Goeze, 1779; Phalaena helcitaria Turton, 1802; Phalaena macularia Fabricius, 1781; Aletis rubricaput Swinhoe, 1904; Aletis contractimargo Prout, 1916; Aletis dissoluta Gaede, 1917

= Scopula helcita =

Species of geometer moth in subfamily Sterrhinae

Scopula helcita is a moth of the family Geometridae first described by Carl Linnaeus in his 1763 Centuria Insectorum. It is found in Cameroon, the Republic of the Congo, the Democratic Republic of the Congo, Equatorial Guinea, Ghana, Nigeria, Sierra Leone, South Africa and Uganda.

The larvae feed on Oxyanthus unilocularis and Blighia unijugata.

== Description ==
Upperside: Antennae black and setaceous (bristly). Head, thorax, and abdomen black, the two last having a row of white spots running along the middle, and another on each side down to the anus. Wings fine dark red. Almost half the anterior next to the tips being black, with five oval white spots thereon; three of which being the largest are joined together, the other two, being small and behind, are at a little distance apart. Posterior wings with a broad black border running from the upper to the abdominal corners, whereon are placed eight oval white spots at equal distances, two, being the outermost, very small and close together.

Underside: Palpi yellow. Tongue spiral. Legs, breast, and sides black, spotted and streaked with white. Abdomen yellow. Wings coloured and marked as on the upperside. Margins of the wings entire. Wing span nearly 3 1/2 inches (87 mm).

== Subspecies ==
- Scopula helcita helcita (Ghana)
- Scopula helcita contractimargo (Prout, 1916) (Uganda)
- Scopula helcita dissoluta (Gaede, 1917) (Cameroon)
