= Miogryllus lineatus =

Scientific classification
- Domain: Eukaryota
- Kingdom: Animalia
- Phylum: Arthropoda
- Class: Insecta
- Order: Orthoptera
- Suborder: Ensifera
- Family: Gryllidae
- Tribe: Gryllini
- Genus: Miogryllus
- Species: M. lineatus

Binomial name
- Miogryllus lineatus (Scudder, 1876)

Species of cricket

Miogryllus lineatus, the western striped cricket, is a species of cricket in the family Gryllidae. It is found in North America.
