= Pseudophasma brachypterum =

Scientific classification
- Kingdom: Animalia
- Phylum: Arthropoda
- Class: Insecta
- Order: Phasmatodea
- Family: Pseudophasmatidae
- Genus: Pseudophasma
- Species: P. brachypterum

Binomial name
- Pseudophasma brachypterum (Linnaeus, 1763)

Synonyms
- Phasma bioculata Stoll, 1813; Gryllus (Mantis) necydaloides Linnaeus, 1763

Species of stick insect

Pseudophasma brachypterum is a species of stick insect found in Brazil, Suriname, Guadeloupe and Peru.

== Taxonomy ==
The species now known as Pseudophasma brachypterum was first described by Carl Linnaeus in 1763, but under two different names in two different versions of the same work. In Centuria Insectorum Rariorum, it was listed as Gryllus (Mantis) brachypterus, but in the later reprint in Amoenitates Academicæ, the name was changed to Gryllus (Mantis) necydaloides.
