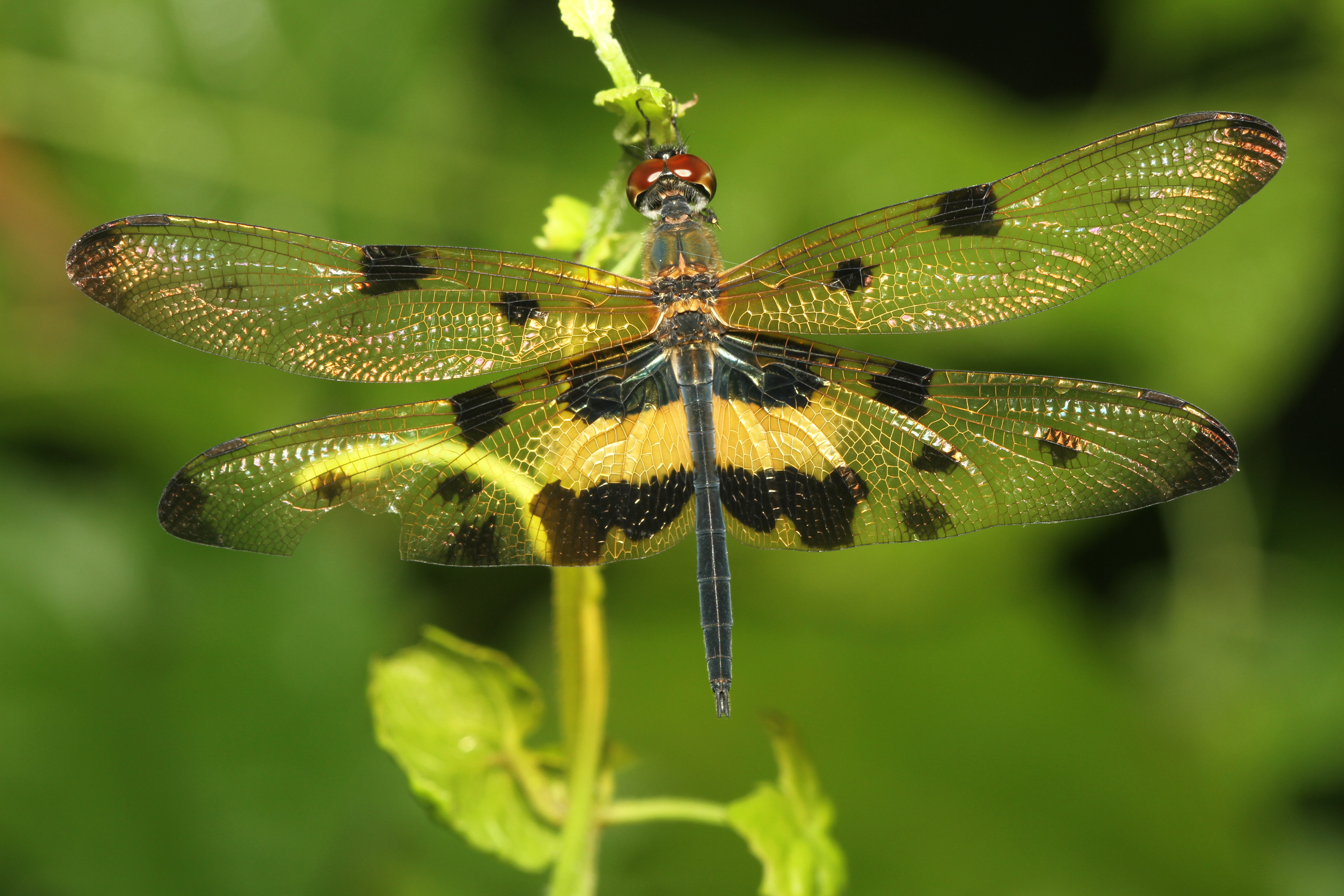
- Male
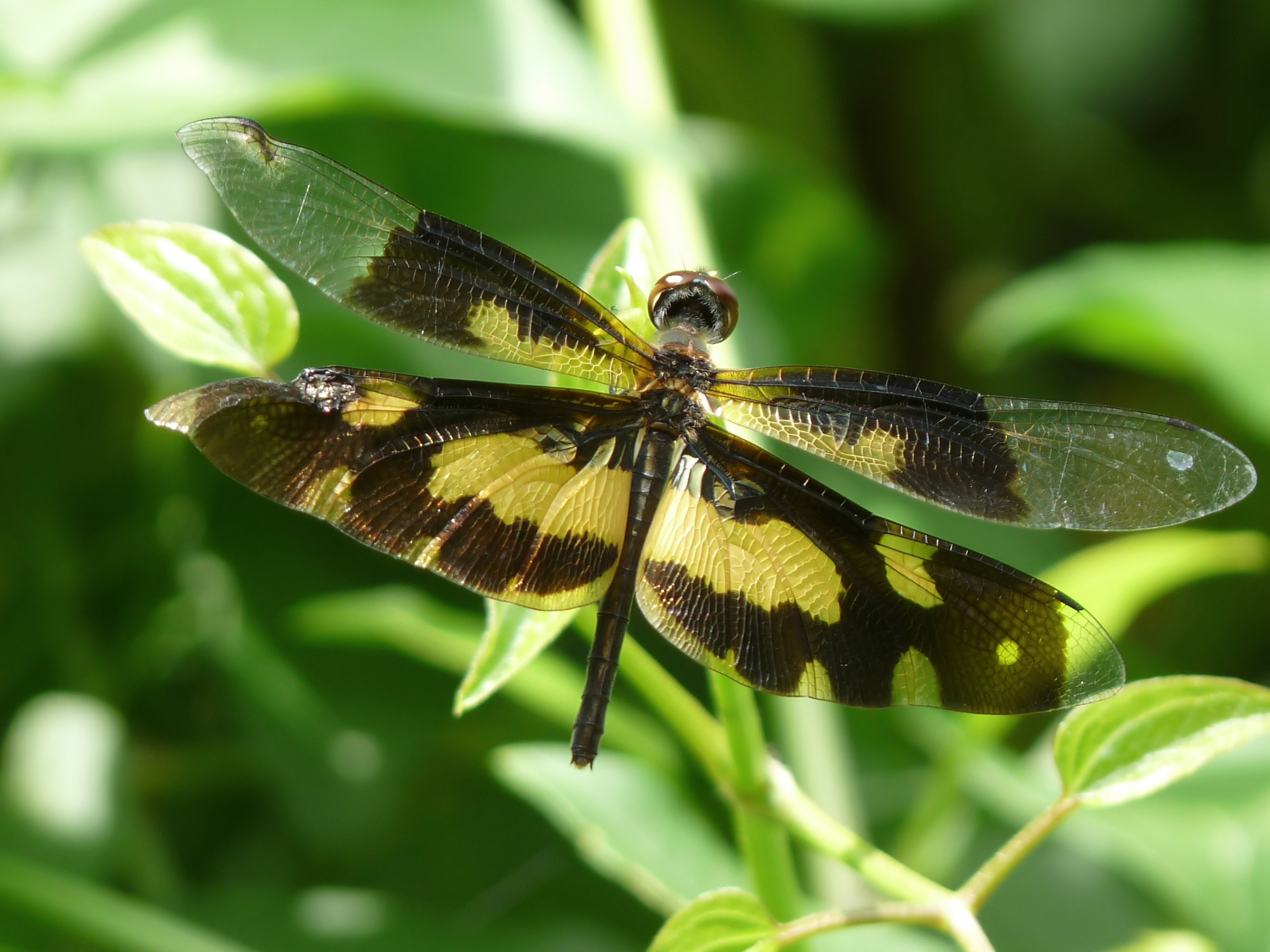
- Female

Conservation status
- Least Concern (IUCN 3.1)

Scientific classification
- Kingdom: Animalia
- Phylum: Arthropoda
- Clade: Pancrustacea
- Class: Insecta
- Order: Odonata
- Infraorder: Anisoptera
- Family: Libellulidae
- Genus: Rhyothemis
- Species: R. variegata

Binomial name
- Rhyothemis variegata (Linnaeus, 1763)

Synonyms
- Libellula arria Drury, 1773; Libellula euphrosine de Hann in Burmeister, 1839; Libellula histrio Fabricius, 1787; Libellula indica Fabricius, 1781; Libellula marcia Drury, 1773; Libellula phyllis Sulzer, 1776; Libellula variegata Linnaeus, 1763; Libellula vittata Weber, 1801; Rhyothemis amaryllis Selys, 1878; Rhyothemis apicalis Kirby, 1889; Rhyothemis chloe Kirby, 1894; Rhyothemis dispar Brauer, 1867; Rhyothemis imperatrix Selys, 1887; Rhyothemis nebulosa Oguma, 1922; Rhyothemis phyllis aequalis Kimmins, 1936; Rhyothemis phyllis beatricis Lieftinck, 1942; Rhyothemis phyllis ixias Lieftinck, 1953; Rhyothemis phyllis marginata Ris, 1913; Rhyothemis phyllis obscura Brauer, 1868; Rhyothemis phyllis subphyllis Selys, 1882; Rhyothemis snelleni Selys, 1878; Rhyothemis vitellina Brauer, 1868

= Rhyothemis variegata =

Species of dragonfly

Rhyothemis variegata, known as the common picture wing, variegated flutterer, yellow-striped flutterer or yellow-barred flutterer, is a species of dragonfly of the family Libellulidae, found in South Asia, Indochina, southern China, Indonesia, Papua New Guinea, Australia and islands in the Pacific Ocean.

== Description and habitat ==
Rhyothemis variegata is a medium-sized dark bodied dragonfly with colorful wings tinted with pale yellow. There are a few black spots on the apices and nodes of the fore-wings. There is a large patch in the base of the hind-wings, marked with black and golden yellow. In females, the apical half of the fore-wings are transparent; basal half tinted with golden-yellow with black marks. The apical ends of the hind-wings are transparent; rest of wings marked with golden-yellow and black.

It breeds in marshes, ponds and paddy fields. They appear to have weak flight and can easily be mistaken for butterflies.

== Taxonomy ==
The species Rhyothemis variegata was first described in 1763 in Centuria insectorum rariorum, a work associated with Carl Linnaeus. The authorship of this publication may be uncertain, as it was produced in connection with Linnaeus’ student Boas Johansson, and some sources have attributed authorship differently. However, the name is generally credited to Linnaeus.

A closely related species, Rhyothemis phyllis, described by Johann Heinrich Sulzer in 1776, was long treated as separate.

A 2025 study found that the differences between these two names fall within the normal variation of a single species. As a result, Rhyothemis phyllis is now regarded as a synonym of Rhyothemis variegata, which has priority as the older name.

== Etymology ==
The genus name Rhyothemis is derived from the Greek ῥέω (rheō, "to flow") and -themis, from Greek Θέμις (Themis), the goddess of divine law, order and justice. In early odonate taxonomy, names ending in -themis were widely used for dragonflies. The name may refer to the irregularly banded and coloured wings of species in the genus, resembling flow banding in rhyolite.

The species name variegata is derived from the Latin variegatus ("variegated" or "variously coloured"), referring to the colouring of the wings.

== Image gallery ==
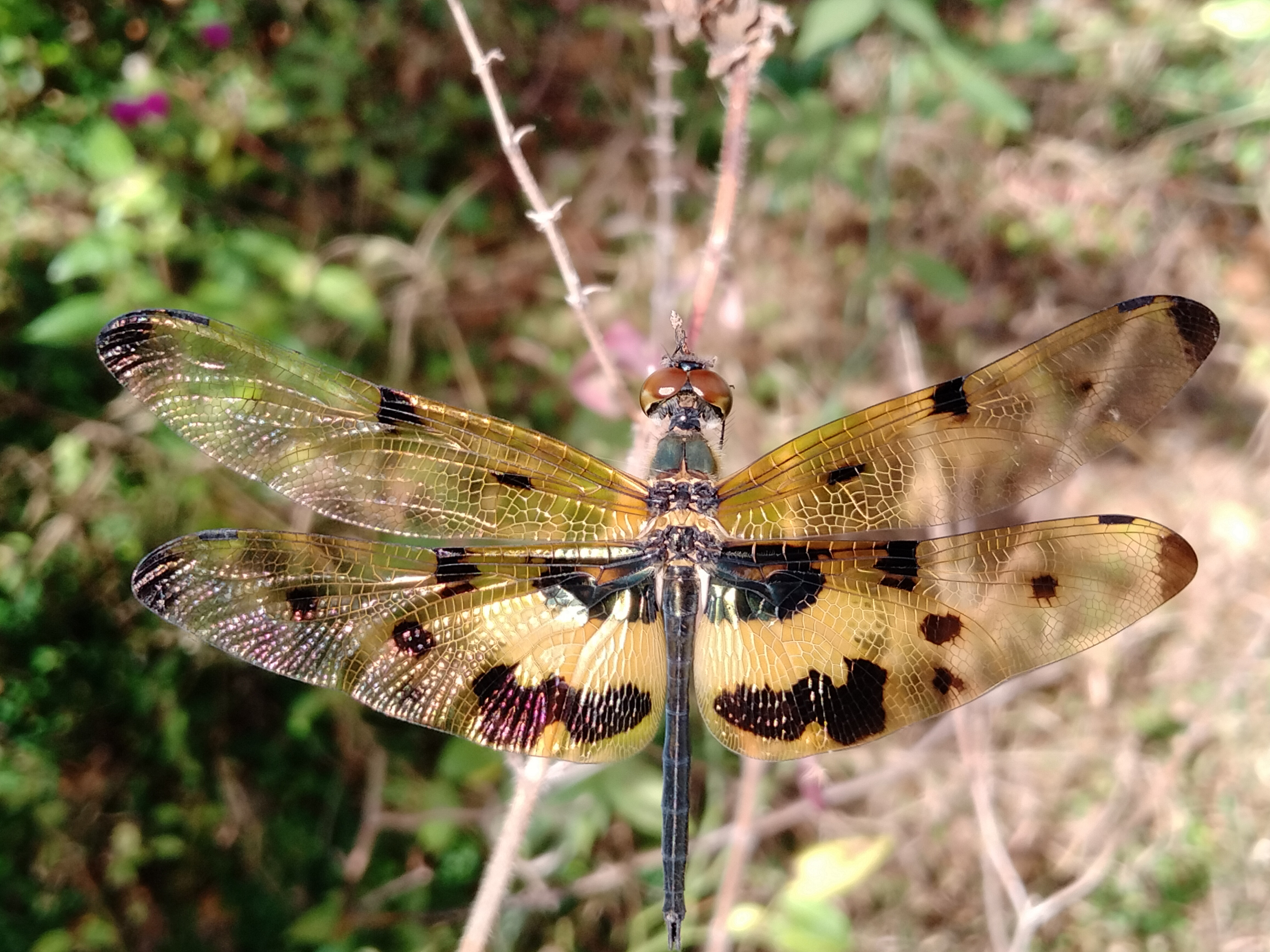
Male, Kottayam, Kerala, India

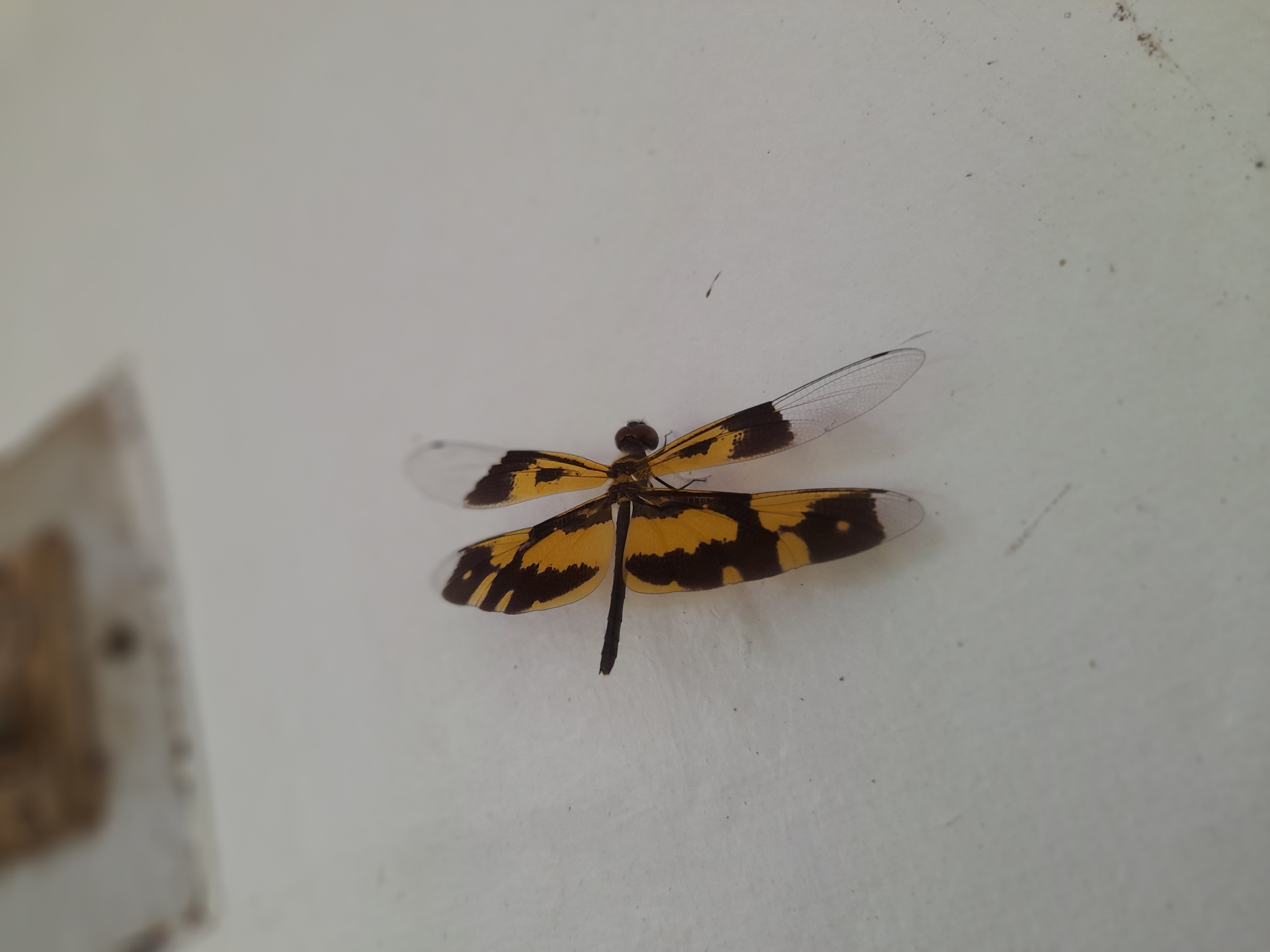
Female

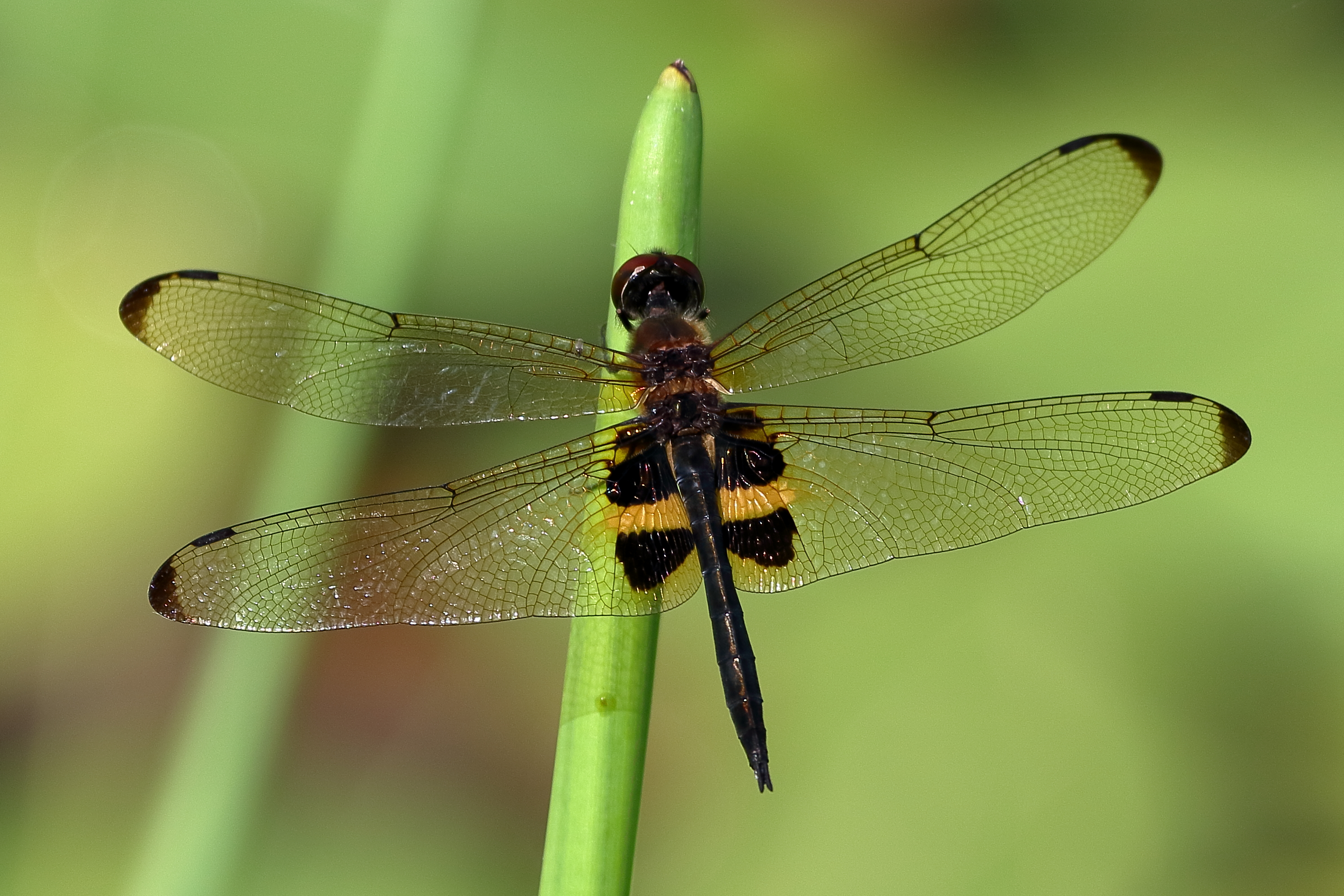
Male, Darwin, Australia

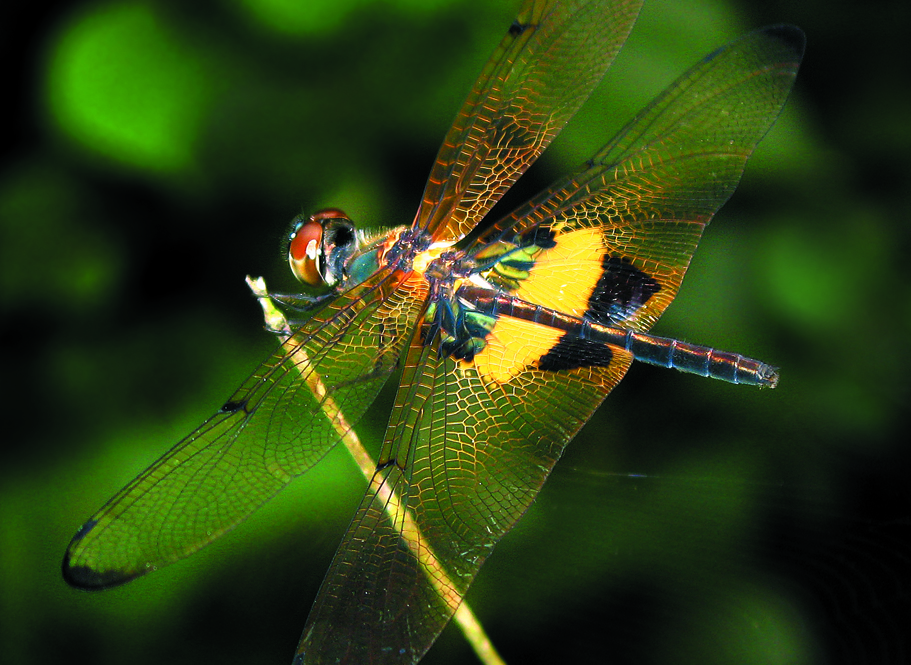
Female

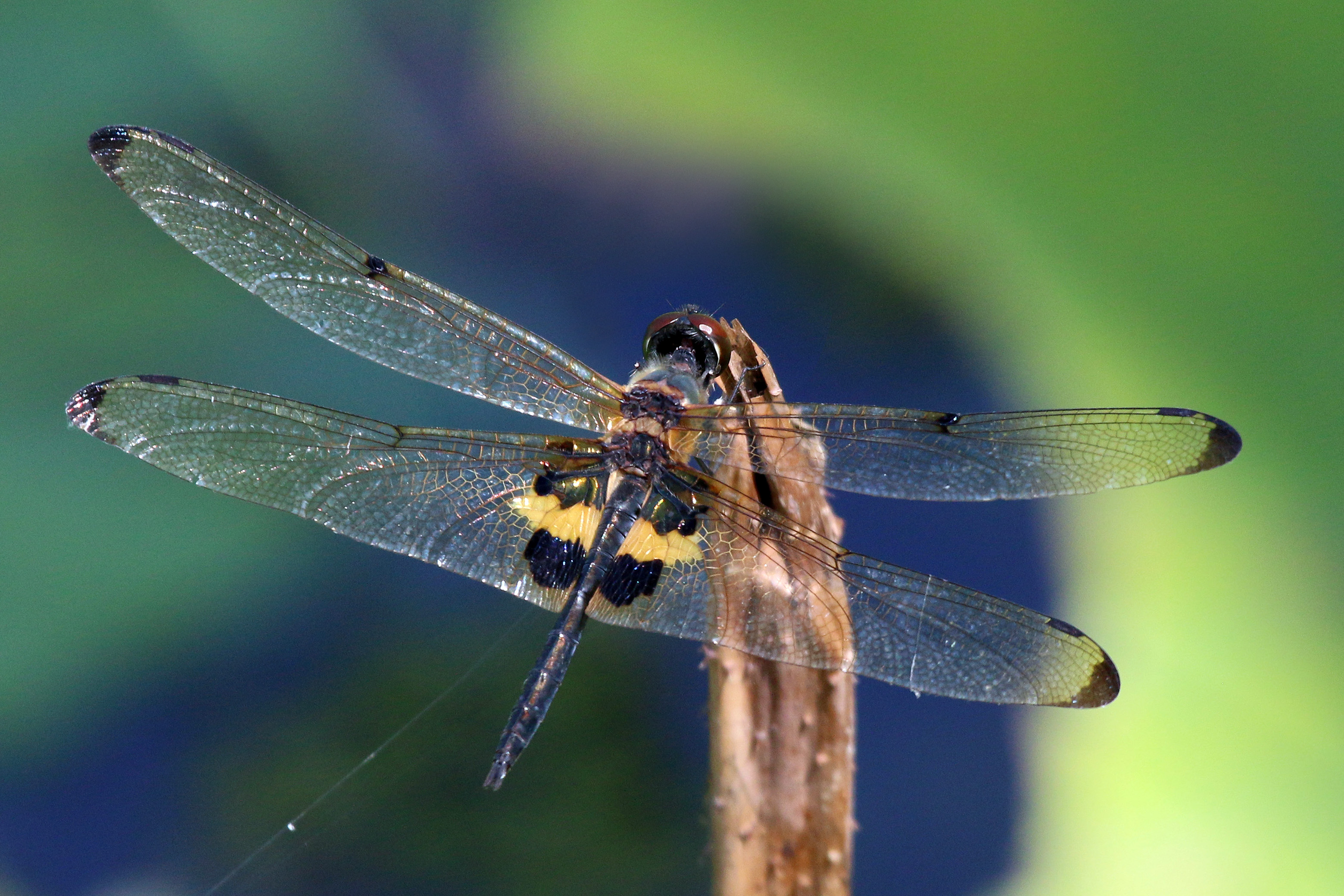
Male

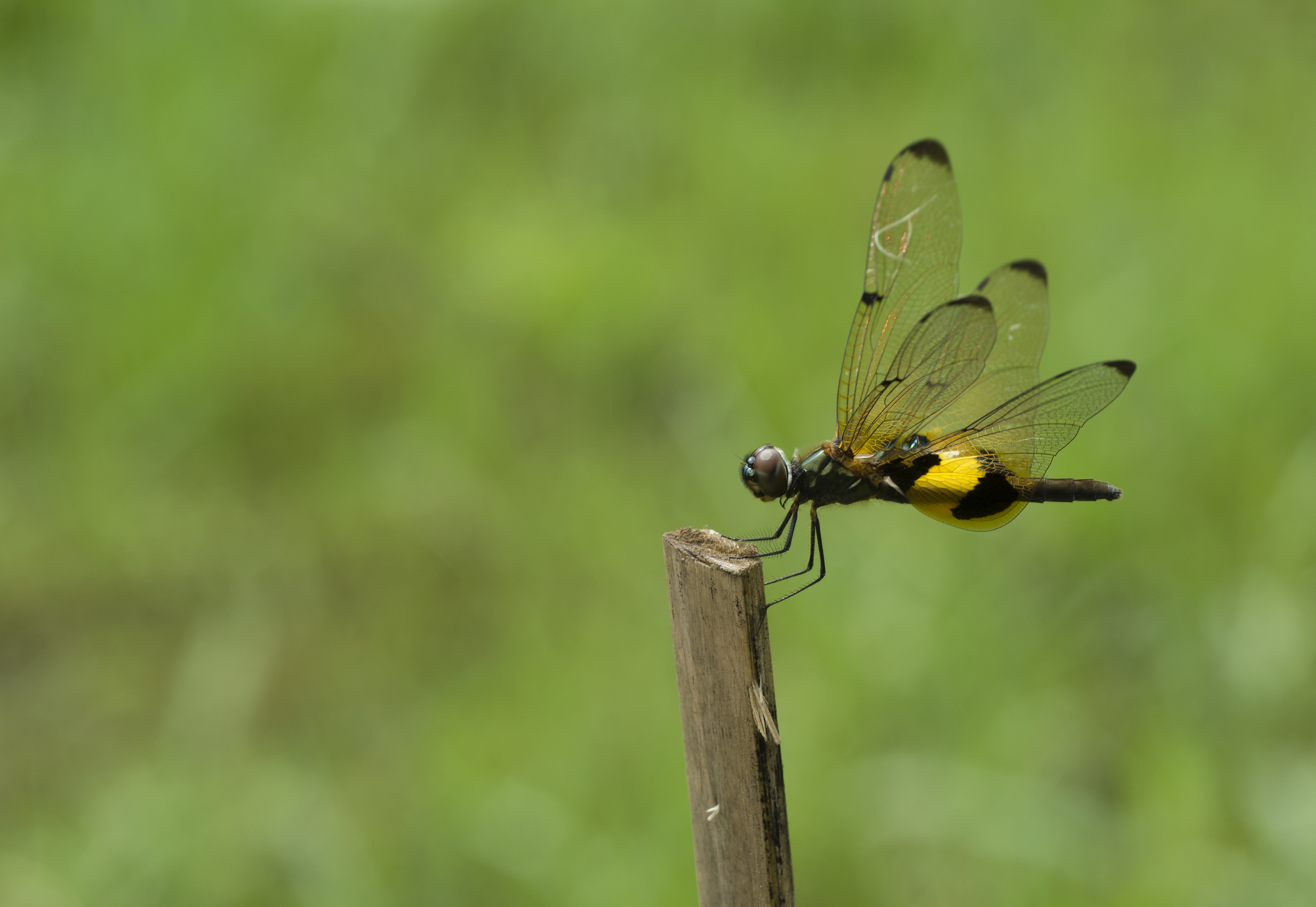
Female

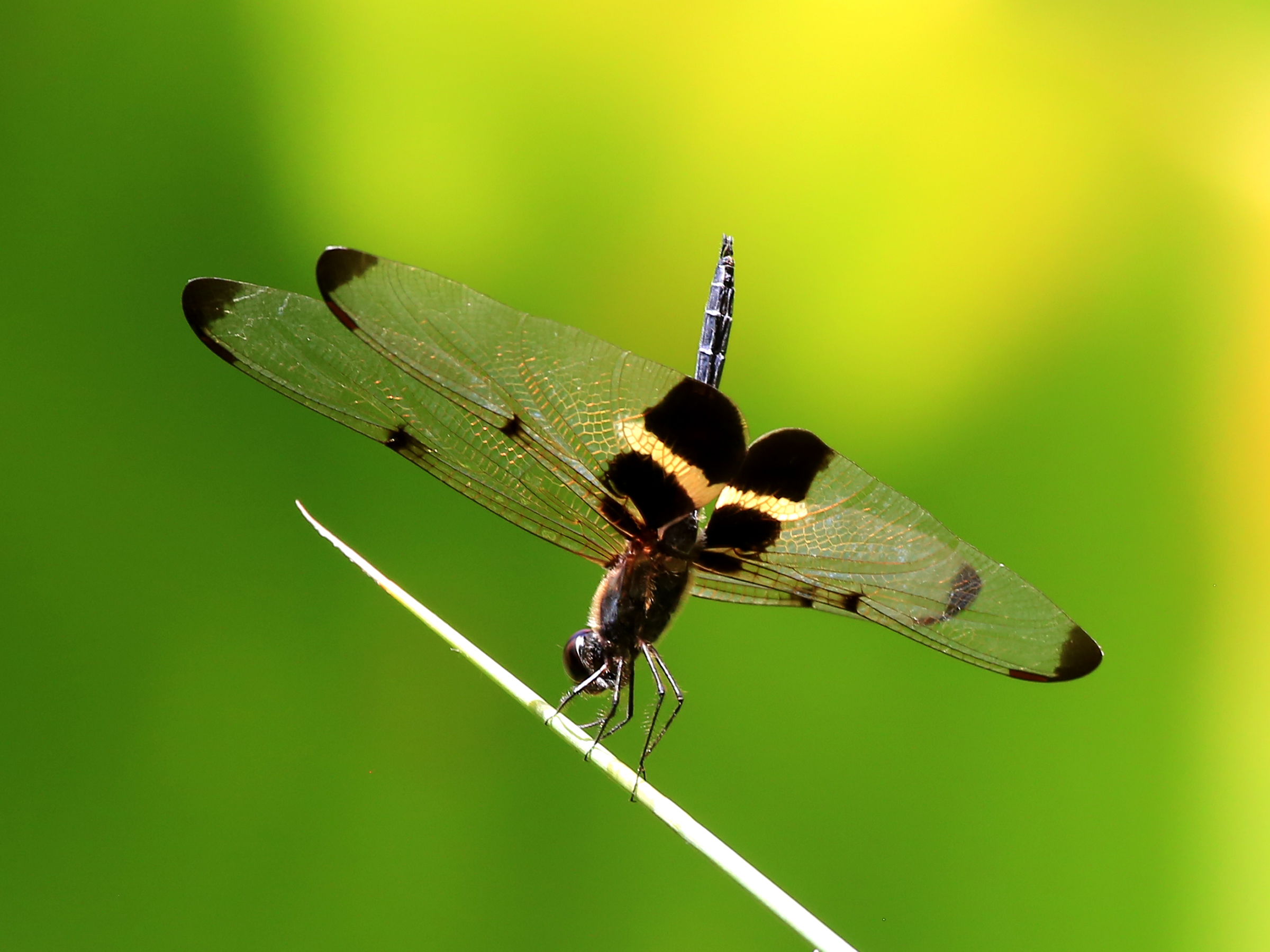
Male adopting an obelisk posture

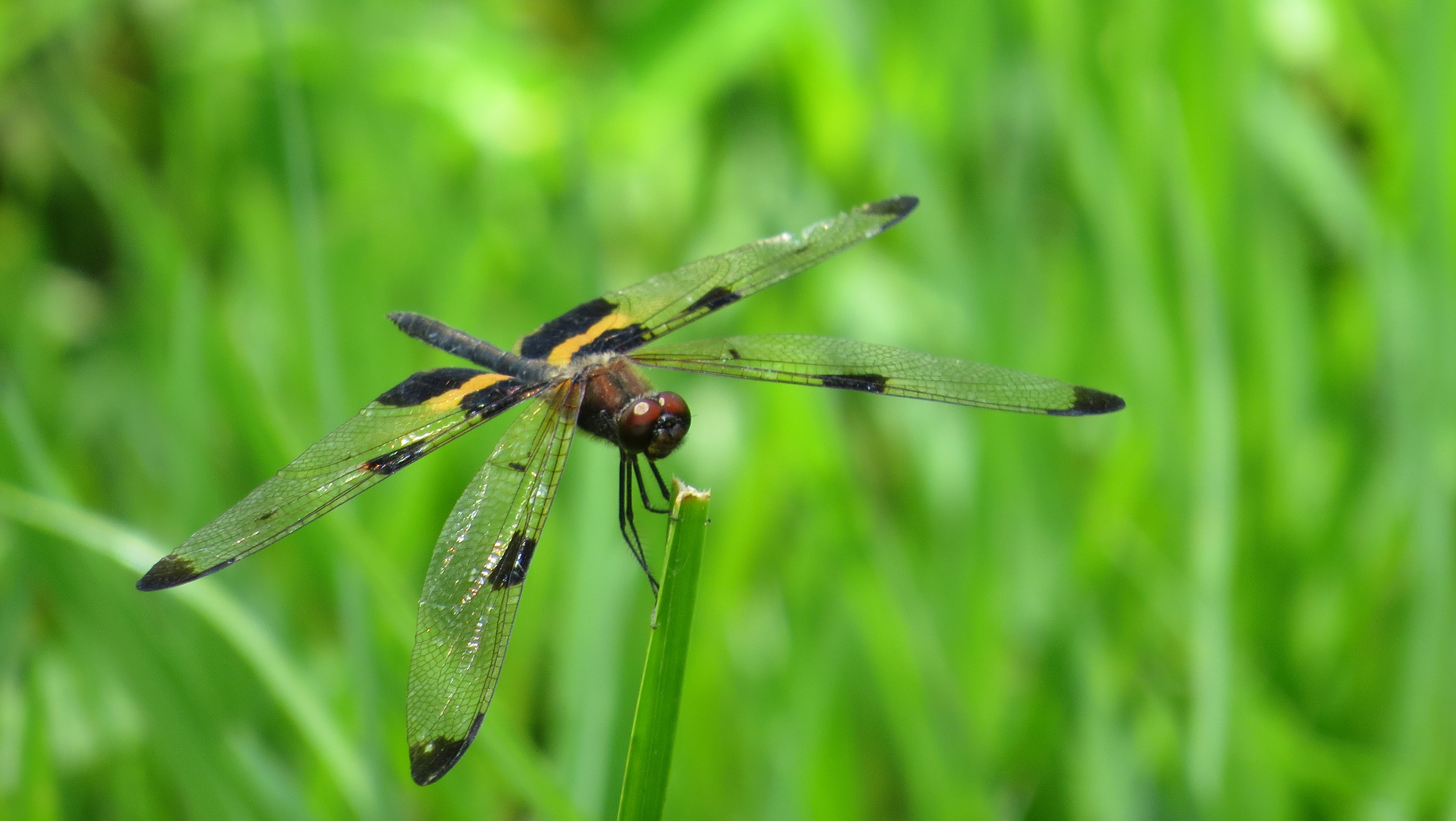
Male face

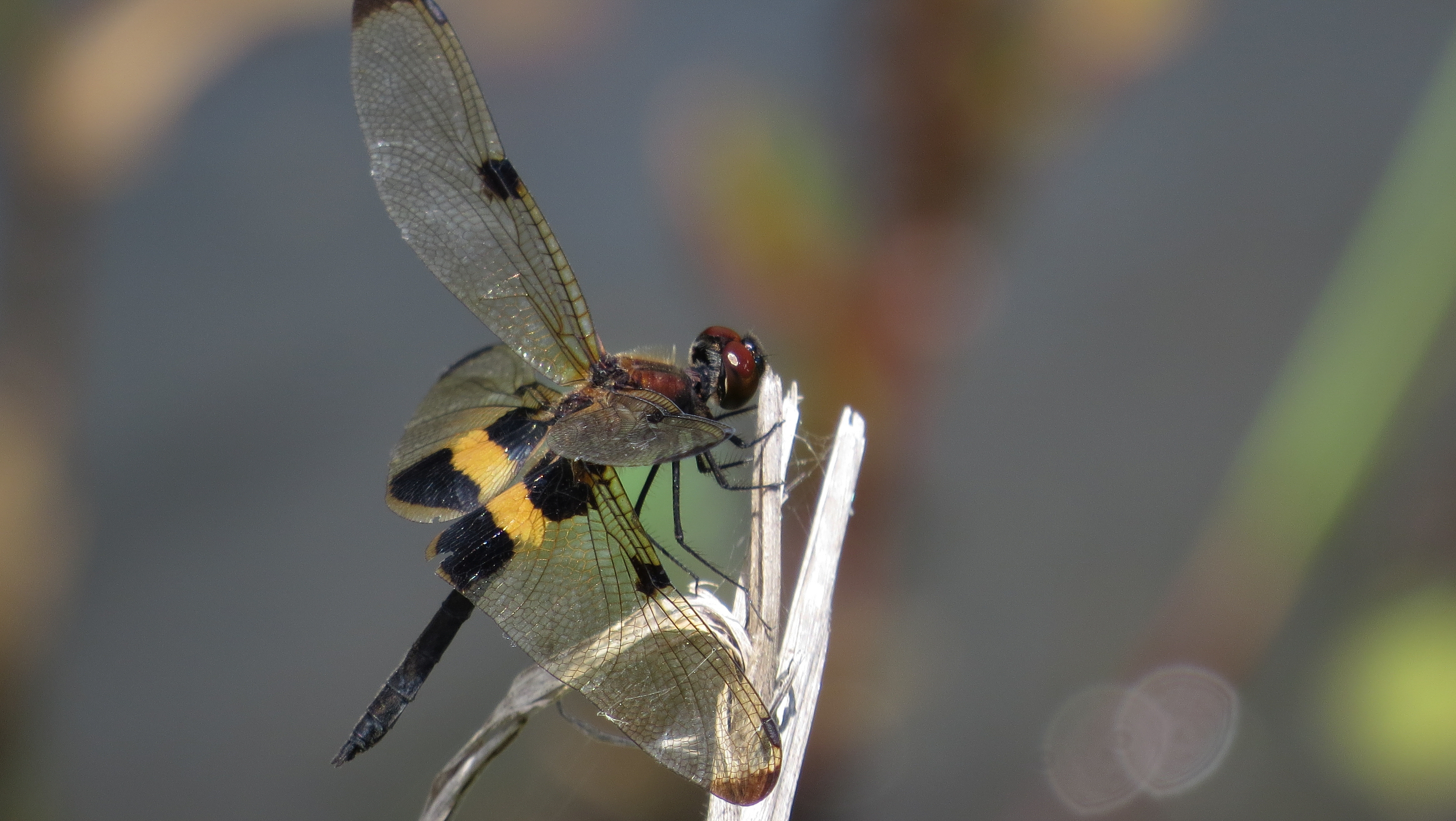
Wings up - wings down

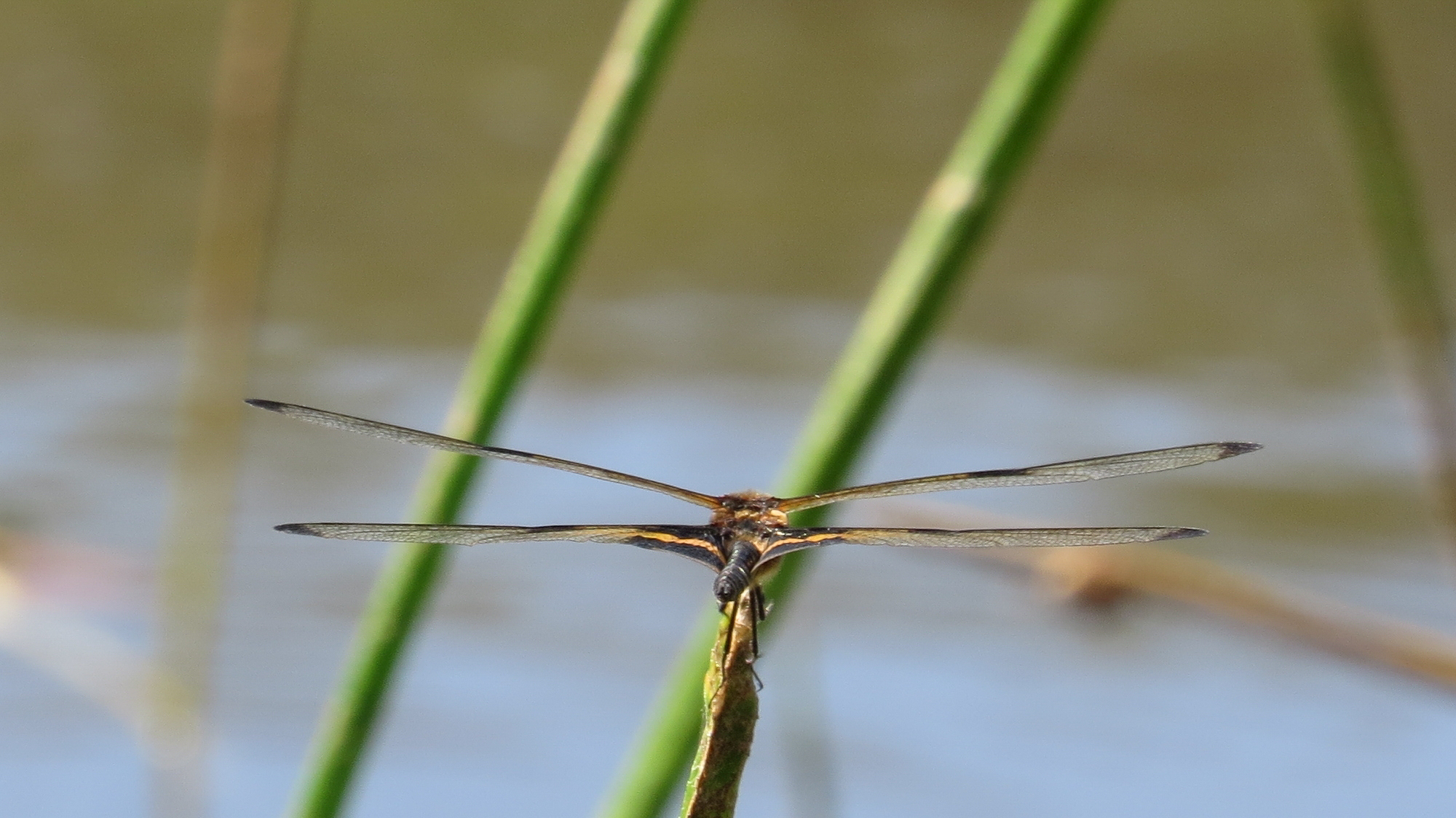
From behind

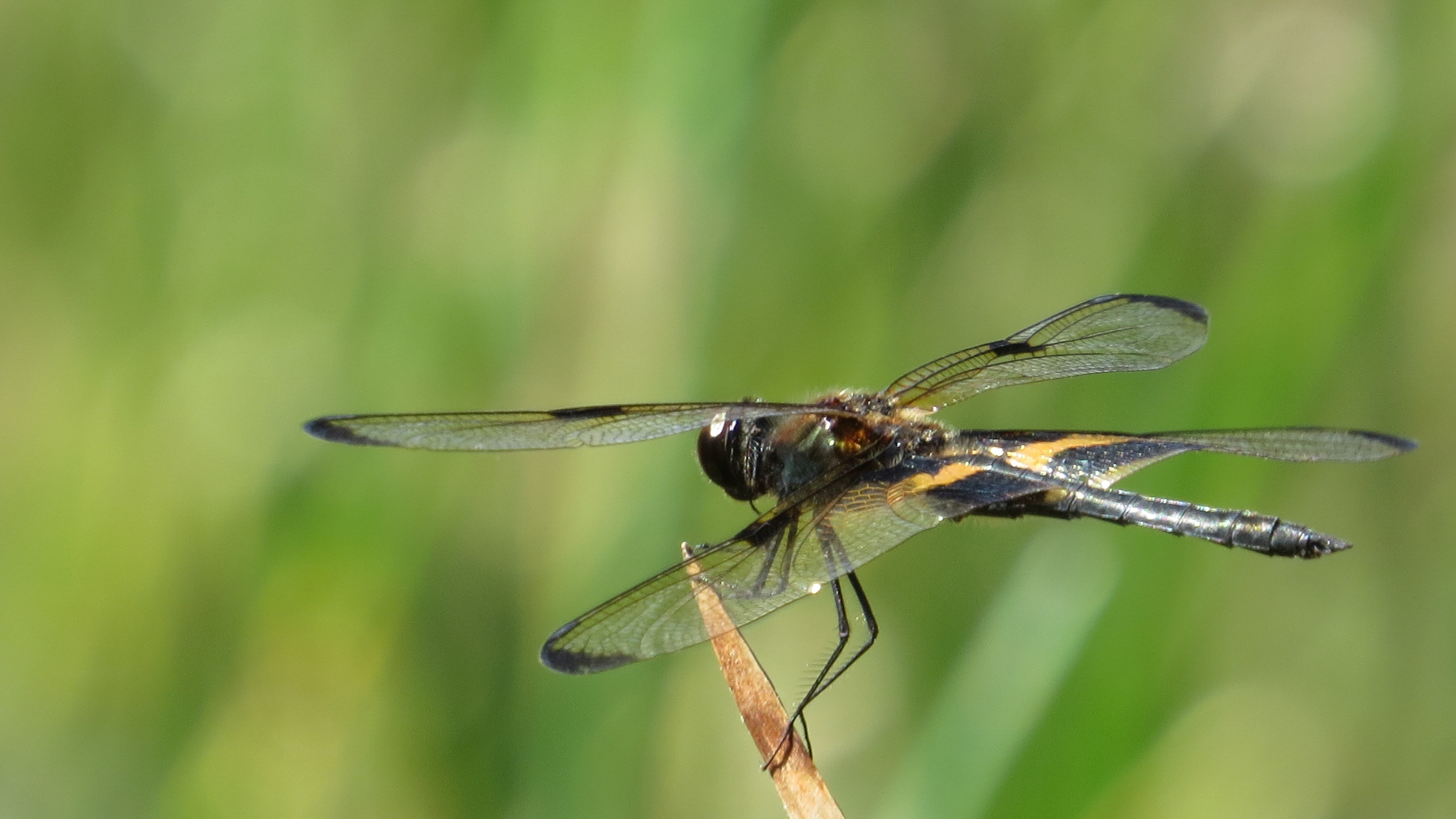
Side view

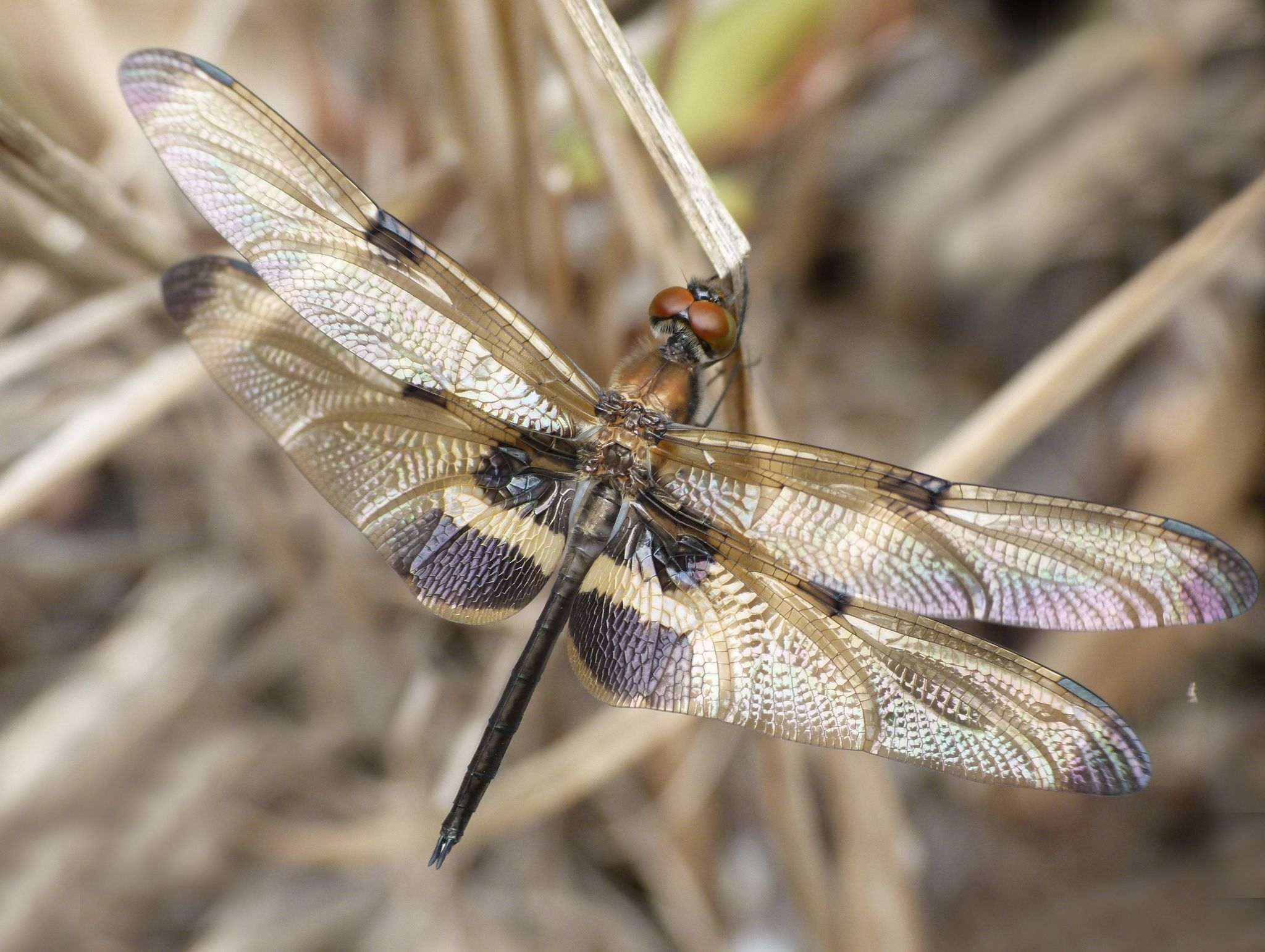
Male teneral, recently emerged

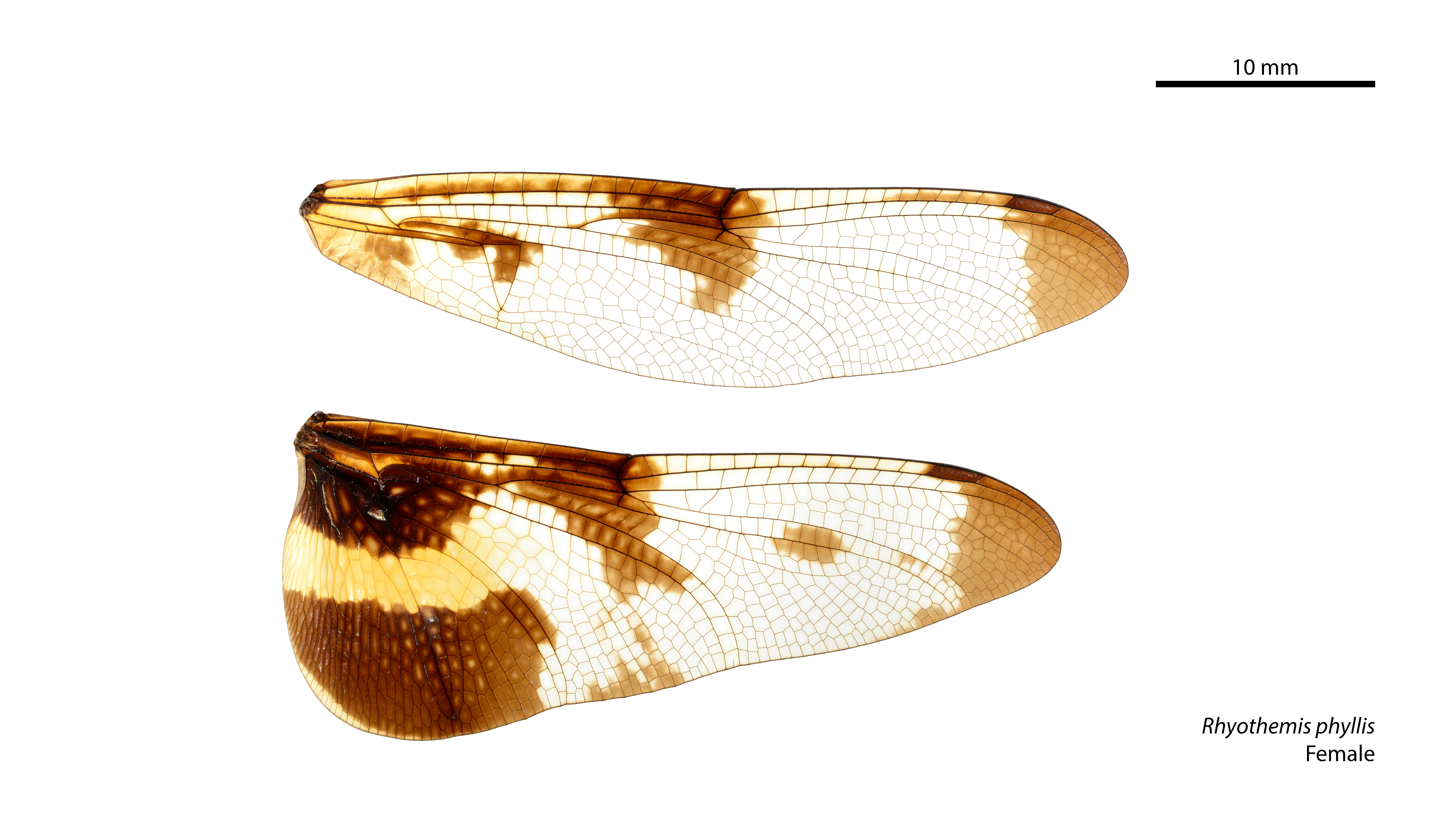
Female wings

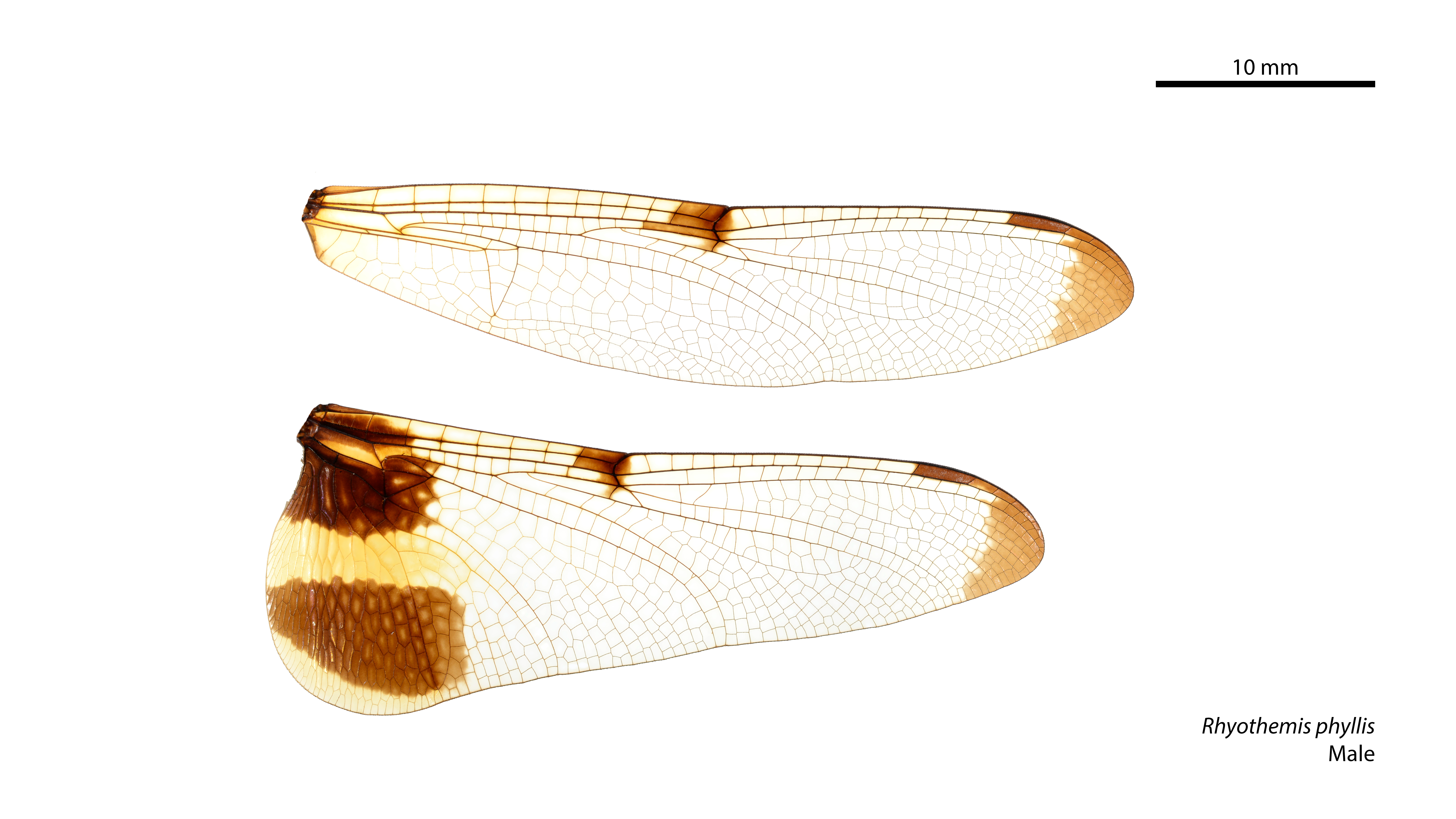
Male wings

== See also ==
- List of odonates of Sri Lanka
- List of odonates of India
- List of odonata of Kerala
- List of Odonata species of Australia
