= Omocerus bicornis =

Scientific classification
- Kingdom: Animalia
- Phylum: Arthropoda
- Class: Insecta
- Order: Coleoptera
- Suborder: Polyphaga
- Infraorder: Cucujiformia
- Family: Chrysomelidae
- Genus: Omocerus
- Species: O. bicornis

Binomial name
- Omocerus bicornis (Linnaeus, 1763)

Synonyms
- Cassida bicornis Linnaeus, 1763; Omocera bicornis (Linnaeus, 1763); Tauroma bicornis (Linnaeus, 1763); Cassida aculeata Voet, 1806

Species of beetle

Omocerus bicornis is a species of tortoise beetle from South America. It lives on Cordia (Boraginaceae) plants, and is found in Brazil, Suriname, French Guiana, Suriname and Venezuela. It was first described by Carl Linnaeus in his 1763 work Centuria Insectorum under the name Cassida bicornis, and was later made the type species of the genus Omocerus by Philogène Auguste Joseph Duponchel and Alcide d'Orbigny in 1843.
