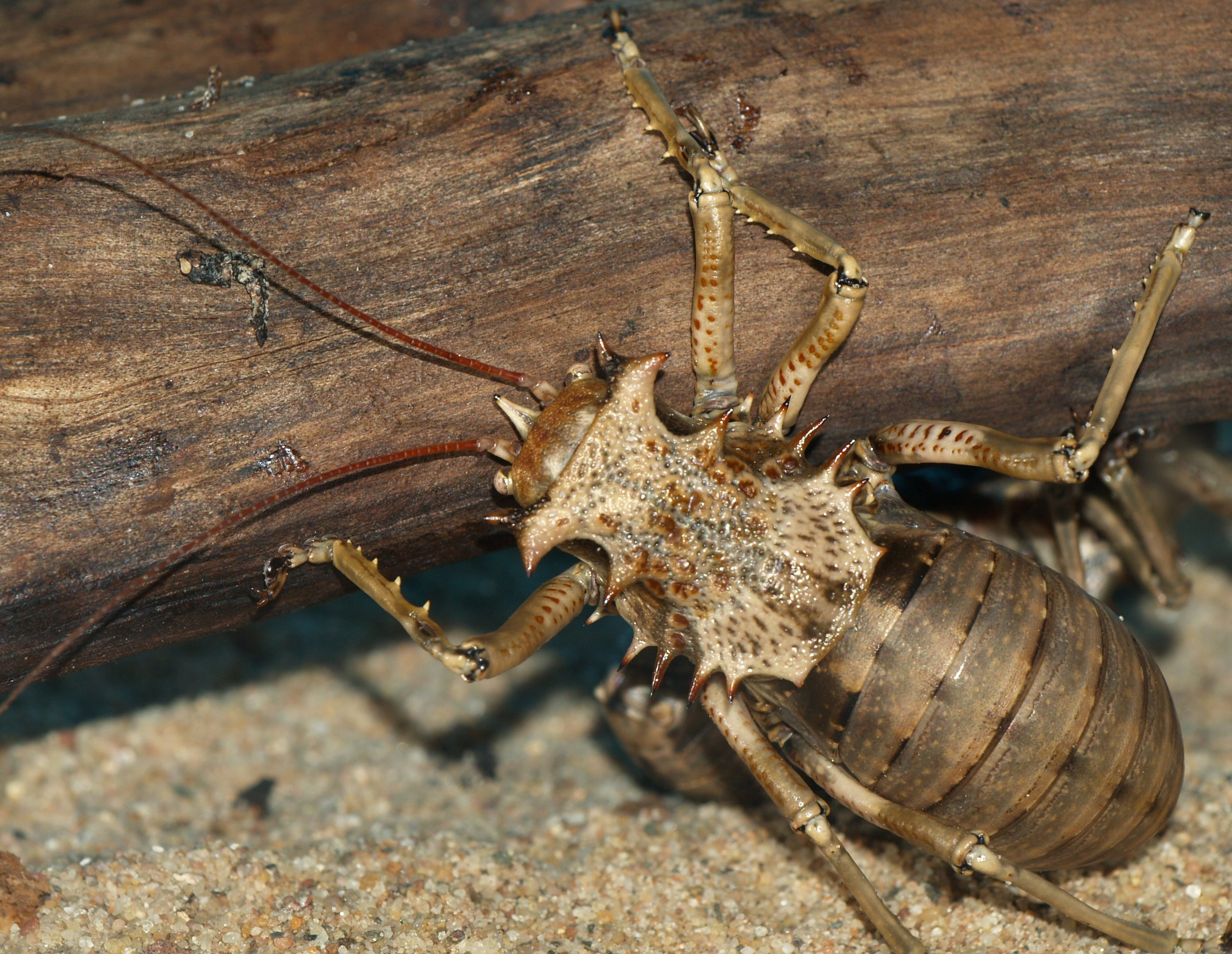

Scientific classification
- Kingdom: Animalia
- Phylum: Arthropoda
- Class: Insecta
- Order: Orthoptera
- Suborder: Ensifera
- Family: Tettigoniidae
- Genus: Eugaster
- Species: E. spinulosa

Binomial name
- Eugaster spinulosa (Linnaeus, 1763)

Synonyms
- Gryllus spinulosus Linnaeus, 1763; Locusta spinulosus (Linnaeus, 1763); Eugaster spinulosus (Linnaeus, 1763); Eugaster immaculata Weidner, 1941

= Eugaster spinulosa =

Species of cricket-like animal

Eugaster spinulosa (Tashelhit: ⵡⴰⴳⵏⵉⵎ wagnim), is a species of bush-cricket from Morocco.

It is known as the whistle cricket, because herdsmen would dry it and pull off its legs, in order to use the cricket as a whistle.

After mating, the male of the species cannot mate again for ten days.

Eugaster spinulosa was first described by Carl Linnaeus in his 1763 work Centuria Insectorum, as Gryllus spinulosus. The holotype had been collected from the "Barbary Coast" (Morocco) in 1756, and was in Alexander Macleay's collection when he travelled to Sydney in 1826. It is the oldest dated specimen in the University of Sydney's Macleay Museum. Its label bears the text "A curious insect from Barbary, the only one known of its kind in England. Geo Edwards, 1756".
