= 12th edition of Systema Naturae =

Book by Carl Linnaeus

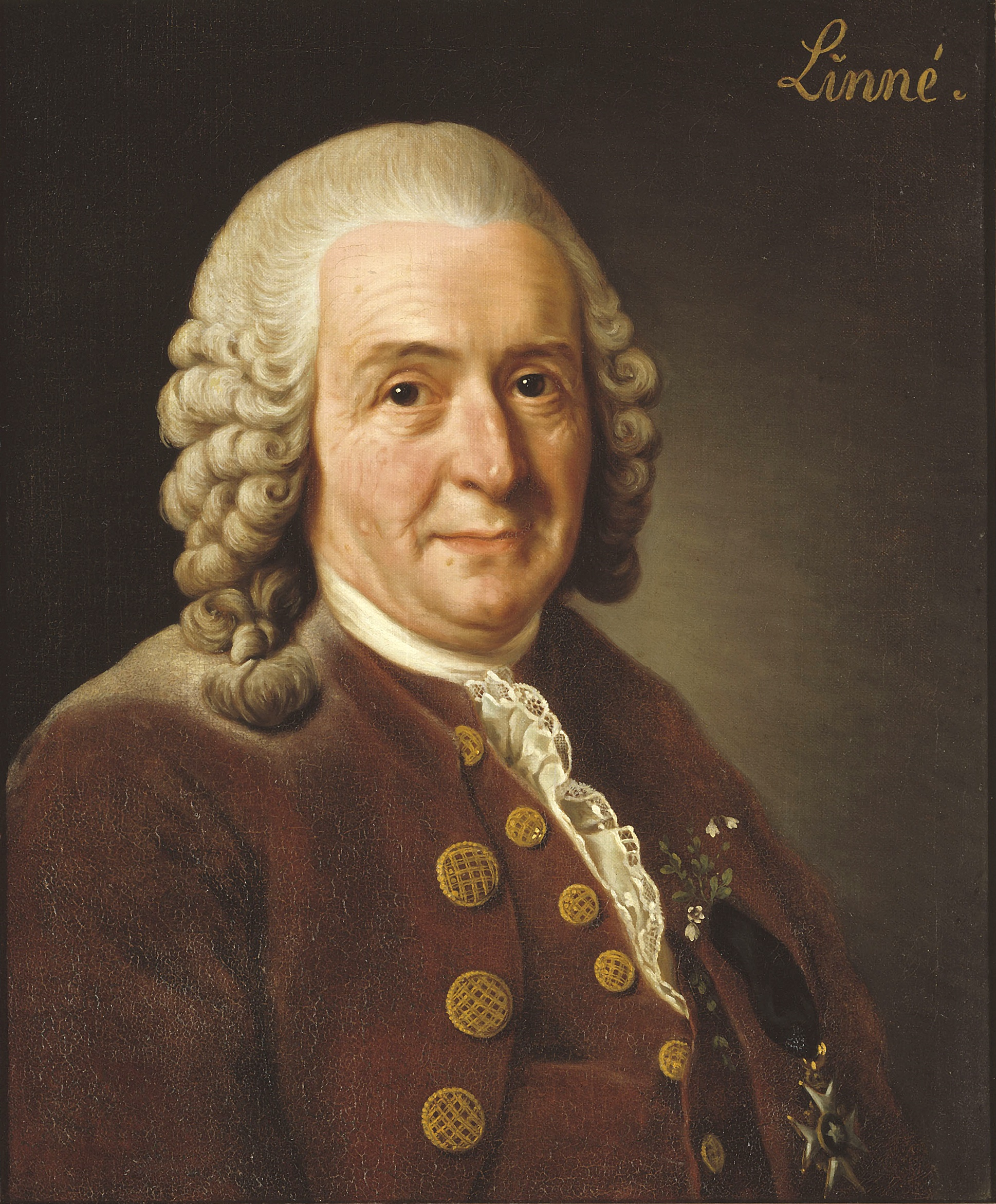
Carl Linnaeus, the author of Systema Naturae

The 12th edition of Systema Naturae was the last edition of Systema Naturae to be overseen by its author, Carl Linnaeus. It was published by Laurentius Salvius in Holmia (Stockholm) in three volumes, with parts appearing from 1766 to 1768. It contains many species not covered in the previous edition, the 10th edition which was the starting point for zoological nomenclature.

== Starting point ==
Only five editions of Systema Naturae were written by Linnaeus himself, namely the first, second, sixth, tenth and twelfth. When a "starting point" for zoological nomenclature was first considered, in the Strickland Code of 1843, the 12th edition of Systema Naturae was chosen, so that any names which Linnaeus had altered from previous editions would be recorded in their final state. It was later replaced by the 10th edition as the starting point for most zoological nomenclature. The starting point for most names in botanical nomenclature is the 1753 work Species Plantarum.

== Format ==
Linnaeus divided the 12th edition into three volumes, the first of which was published in two parts. Volume 1 covered Regnum Animale – the animal kingdom – with the first 532 pages appearing as Part 1 in 1766, and pages 533–1327 appearing as Part 2 in 1767. Volume 2 covered Regnum Vegetabile – the plant kingdom; it comprised 736 pages and appeared in 1767, with an additional 142-page Mantissa Plantarum. Volume 3 covered Regnum Lapideum – the mineral kingdom – and appendices to all three volumes; it comprised 236 pages and was published in 1768. Including appendices, front matter and back matter, the three volumes cover around 2,400 pages.

== Novelties ==
Many species were included in the 12th edition which had not been included in earlier editions. For example, Linnaeus had included 700 species of mollusc in the 10th edition, and added a further 100 species for the 12th edition. Similarly, the number of bird species in the 12th edition was twice the number in the 10th edition. Sponges were included in the 12th edition, in the class "Zoophyta", having been omitted from previous editions. The 12th edition also included the hundred insect species published separately in Centuria Insectorum, and omitted a claim which Linnaeus had made in earlier editions, that new species do not form, implicitly allowing speciation. Also, on the last page of the book, Linnaeus added a new genus he named "chaos" in order zoophyta, class vermes. Into that order were included some species, like chaos fungorum, chaos ustilagum, chaos protheus, chaos redivivum, chaos infusorium. In fact, chaos infusorium included every known protist of the 18th century (except volvox, that was divided into its own genus).
