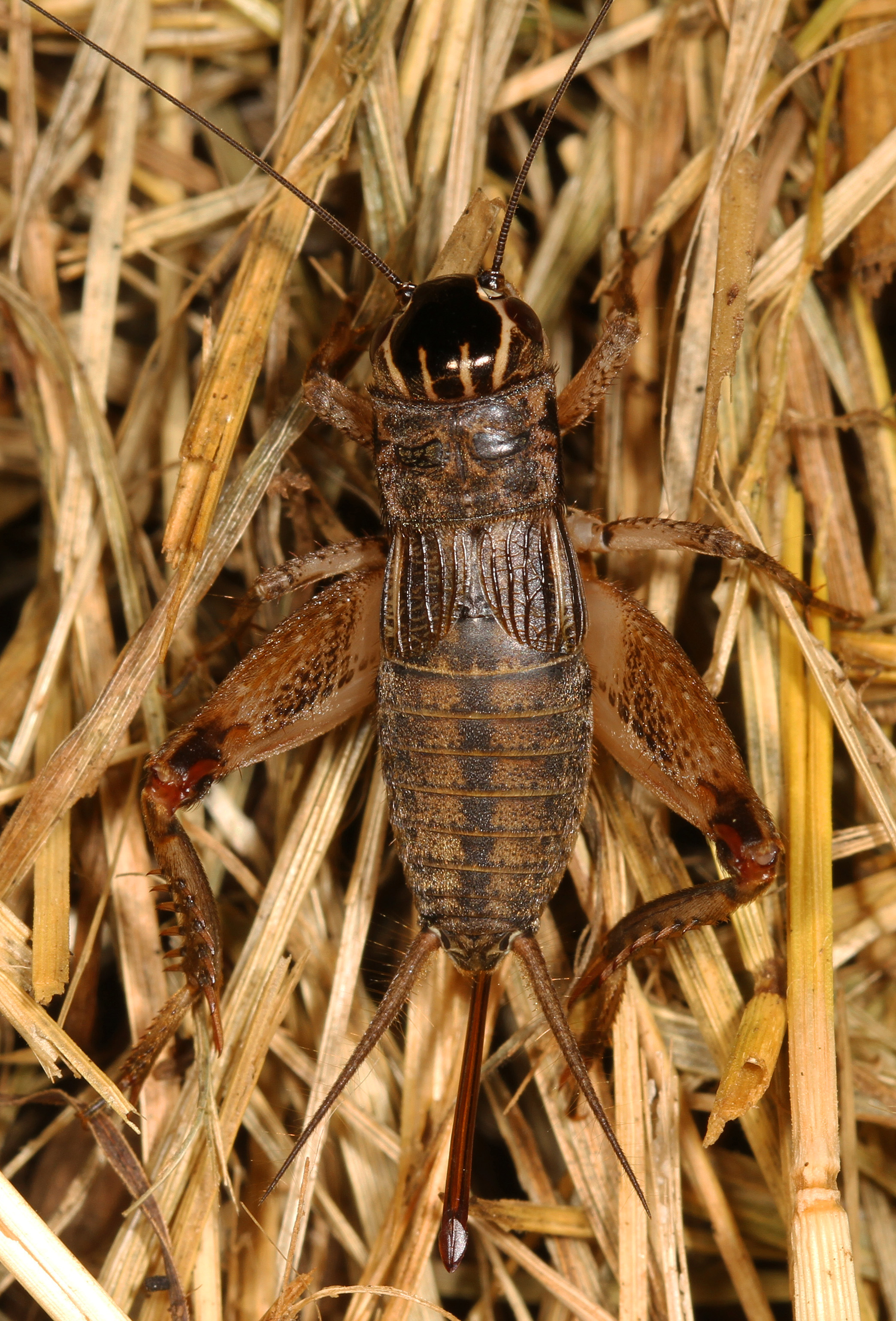

Scientific classification
- Kingdom: Animalia
- Phylum: Arthropoda
- Clade: Pancrustacea
- Class: Insecta
- Order: Orthoptera
- Suborder: Ensifera
- Family: Gryllidae
- Genus: Miogryllus
- Species: M. verticalis

Binomial name
- Miogryllus verticalis (Serville, 1838)

Synonyms
- Miogryllus saussurei (Scudder, 1877) Scudder, 1877; Miogryllus oklahomae Caudell, 1902; Gryllodes argentinus Bruner, 1916; Gryllodes guyennensis Saussure, 1877; Gryllodes laplatae (Saussure, 1874); Gryllodes saussurei (Scudder, 1877); Gryllopsis atrifrons Chopard, 1930; Gryllopsis platythorax Chopard, 1930; Gryllus forticeps Saussure, 1874; Gryllus laplatae Saussure, 1874; Gryllus saussurei Scudder, 1877; Gryllus signatipes Walker, 1869; Gryllus verticalis Serville, 1838

= Miogryllus verticalis =

Species of cricket

Miogryllus verticalis, the eastern striped cricket, is a species of field cricket in the family Gryllidae. It is found in eastern North America, Central America, and South America.

The species Miogryllus saussurei, formerly an independent species, is now considered a synonym of Miogryllus verticalis.
