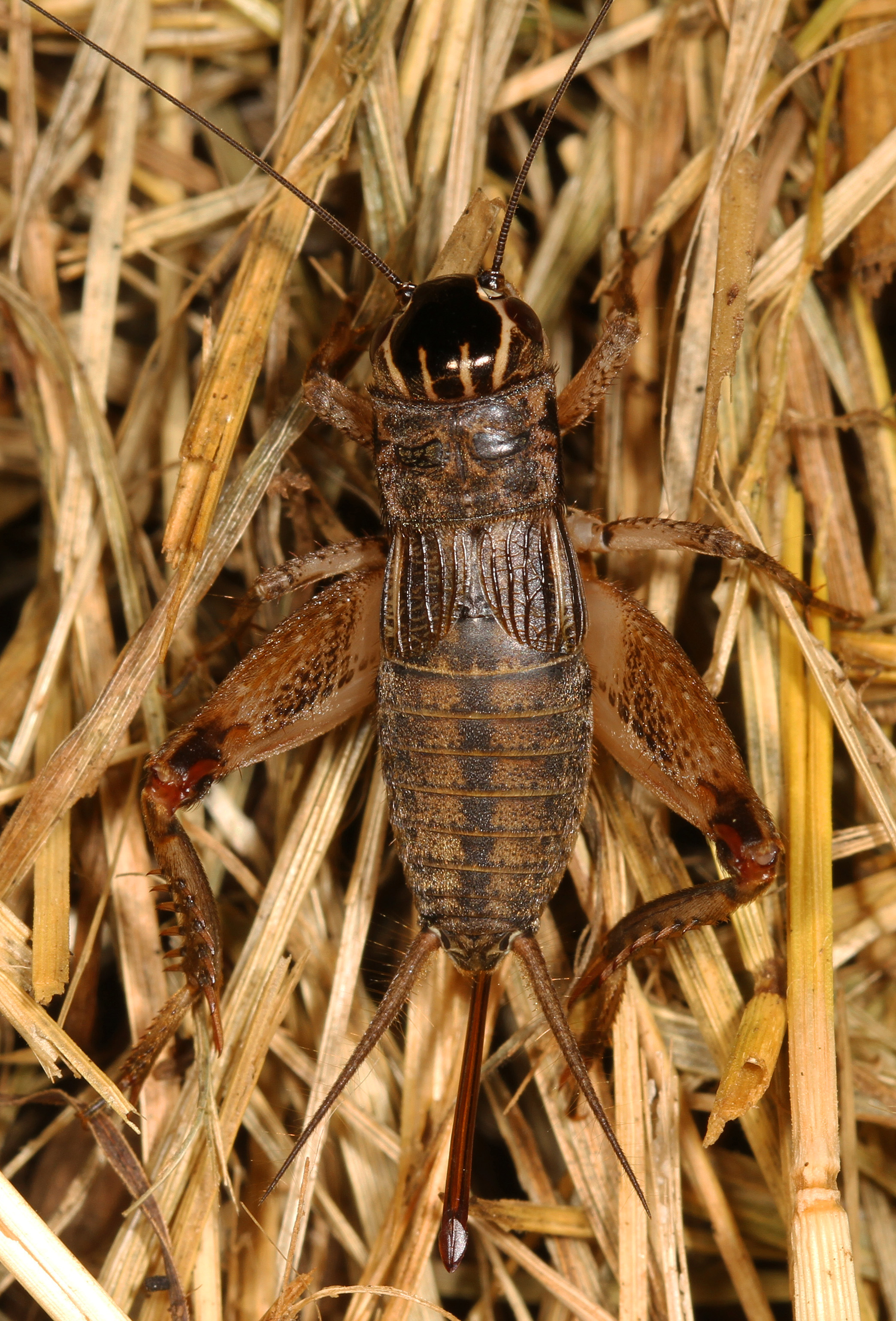
- Miogryllus saussurei, eastern striped cricket

Scientific classification
- Domain: Eukaryota
- Kingdom: Animalia
- Phylum: Arthropoda
- Class: Insecta
- Order: Orthoptera
- Suborder: Ensifera
- Family: Gryllidae
- Tribe: Gryllini
- Genus: Miogryllus; Saussure, 1877

= Miogryllus =

Genus of crickets

Miogryllus is a genus of "true crickets" in the subfamily Gryllinae and tribe Gryllini from the Americas. Members of the genus Miogryllus are called striped crickets, also lesser field crickets. There are two North American species of Miogryllus, Miogryllus lineatus, the western striped cricket, and Miogryllus saussurei, the eastern striped cricket.

== Species ==
The genus contains the following species:

- Miogryllus amatorius Otte, 2006
- Miogryllus beliz Otte & Perez-Gelabert, 2009
- Miogryllus bellator Otte & Perez-Gelabert, 2009
- Miogryllus bohlsii (Giglio-Tos, 1895)
- Miogryllus caparo Otte & Perez-Gelabert, 2009
- Miogryllus catacustes Otte & Perez-Gelabert, 2009
- Miogryllus convolutus (Johannson, 1763)
- Miogryllus ensifer (Scudder, 1896)
- Miogryllus ergaticos Otte & Perez-Gelabert, 2009
- Miogryllus guanta Otte & Perez-Gelabert, 2009
- Miogryllus incertus (Giglio-Tos, 1894)
- Miogryllus itaquiensis Orsini & Zefa, 2017
- Miogryllus lineatus (Scudder, 1876)
- Miogryllus muranyi de Mello & Morselli, 2011
- Miogryllus pammelas Otte, 2006
- Miogryllus piracicabensis Piza, 1960
- Miogryllus pugnans Otte & Perez-Gelabert, 2009
- Miogryllus rehni (Randell, 1964)
- Miogryllus saussurei (Serville 1838)
- Miogryllus scythros Otte, 2006
- Miogryllus tobago Otte & Perez-Gelabert, 2009
- Miogryllus tucumanensis Giglio-Tos, 1894
- Miogryllus verticalis (Serville, 1838)
