= Centuria Insectorum =

Book by Carl Linnaeus

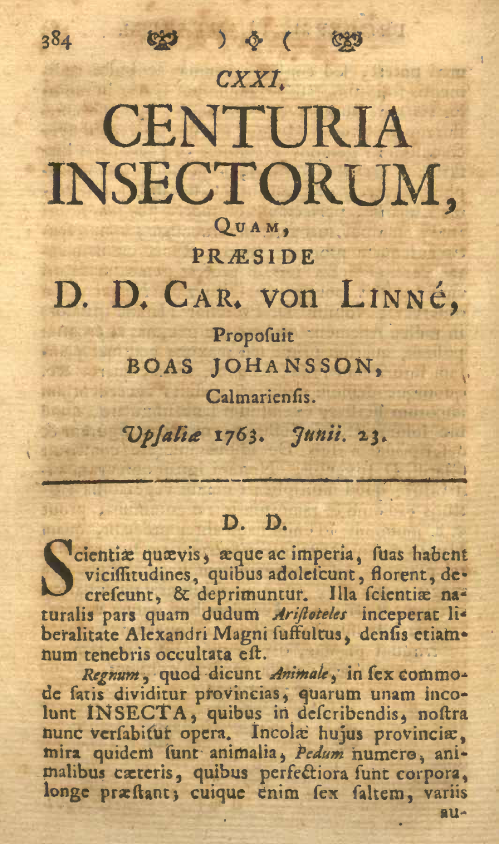
The first page of Centuria Insectorum, as included in Amoenitates Academicæ

Centuria Insectorum (Latin, "one hundred insects") is a 1763 taxonomic work by Carl Linnaeus, and defended as a thesis by Boas Johansson; which of the two men should for taxonomic purposes be credited with its authorship has been the subject of some controversy. It includes descriptions of 102 new insect and crustacean species that had been sent to Linnaeus from British America, Suriname, Java and other locations. Most of the new names included in Centuria Insectorum are still in use, although a few have been sunk into synonymy, and one was the result of a hoax: a common brimstone butterfly with spots painted on was described as the new "species" Papilio ecclipsis.

== Publications ==
The contents of the work were published twice, under two slightly different titles. Centuria Insectorum Rariorum ("one hundred rare insects") was published as a standalone thesis, while Centuria Insectorum was published as part of Linnaeus' series of Amoenitates Academicæ ("academic delights"). Both bear the date June 23, 1763, although the latter was printed later, in September 1763.

== Authorship ==
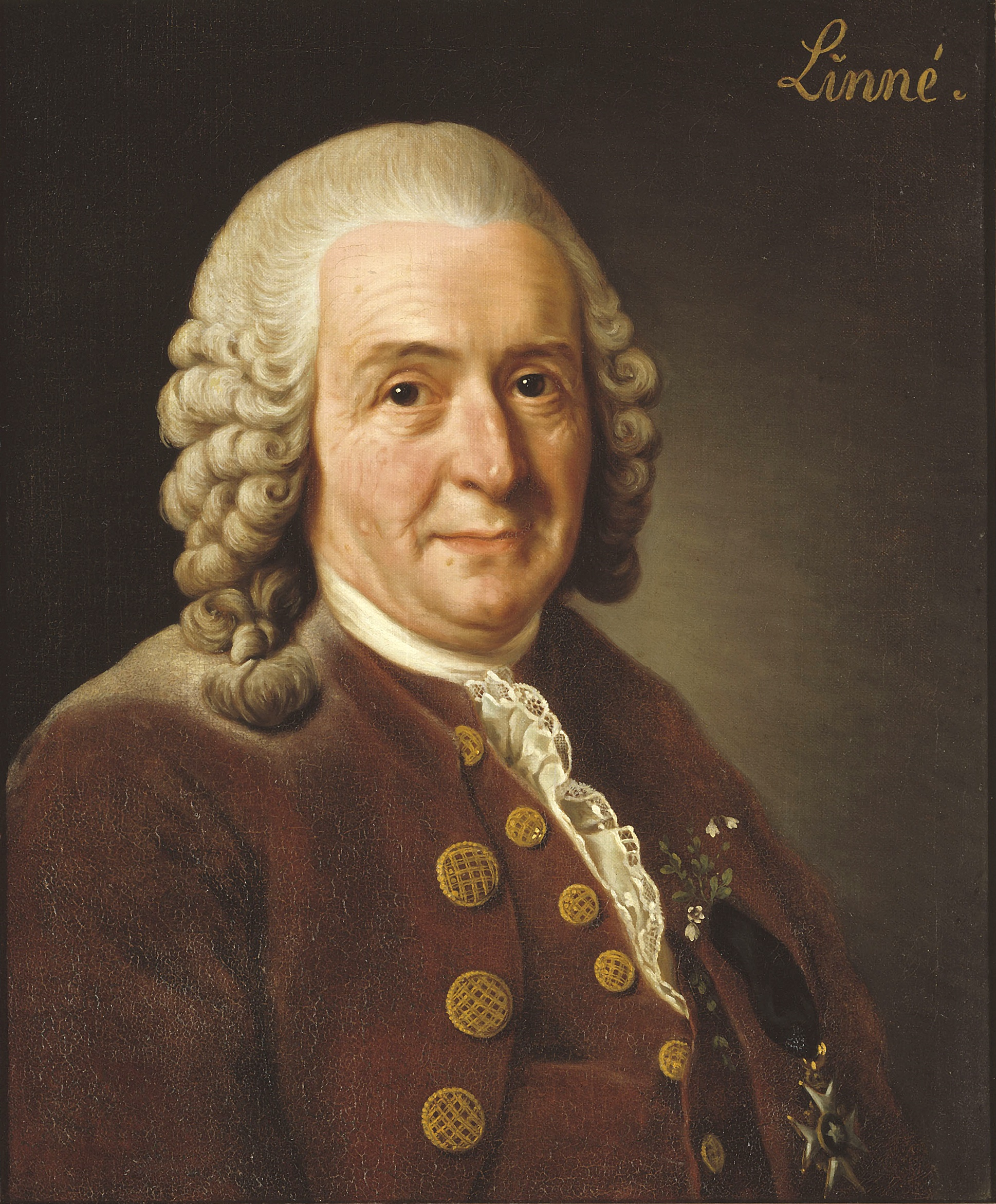
Carl Linnaeus, the probable author of Centuria Insectorum

Since Centuria Insectorum Rariorum was a thesis presented and defended by one of Linnaeus' students, Boas Johansson (1742–1809) from Kalmar, it has been argued that authorship of the taxa named in it should be assigned to Johansson. The authorship, however, has been the subject of some controversy.

Several lines of argument have been used to suggest that Linnaeus should be considered the author. The role of the person defending the thesis at Swedish universities at the time was to prove his command of Latin, and responsibility for the text of the thesis rested mainly, if not entirely, with the professor. Linnaeus appeared to consider himself the author, referring in his later works to Amoenitates Academicæ without including an abbreviation for the author, as he did for works written by other people. Works presented by students of other taxonomists of the era (such as Carl Peter Thunberg, Adam Afzelius and Elias Magnus Fries) are generally credited to their supervisors, and not the students themselves. Finally, most zoologists, and "Scandinavian authorities on Linnaeana" consider Linnaeus the author; in the interests of nomenclatural stability, it is preferable to continue doing so. The issue was raised in a petition to the International Commission on Zoological Nomenclature and, although a large majority voted in favour of recognising Linnaeus as the author, the one dissenting vote caused the commission to defer its decision.

== Sources ==
The specimens used by Linnaeus or Johansson in writing Centuria Insectorum include some provided by Dr Alexander Garden, a horticulturist from Charles Town in the Province of South Carolina, by Carl Gustav Dahlberg in Suriname, by Hans Johan Nordgren in Java, and from the collection of Baron Charles De Geer from the Province of Pennsylvania.

== Contents ==
The dissertation begins by discussing improvements that the Linnaean system of taxonomy has brought to the study of insects, before describing the new species.

=== Brimstone hoax ===
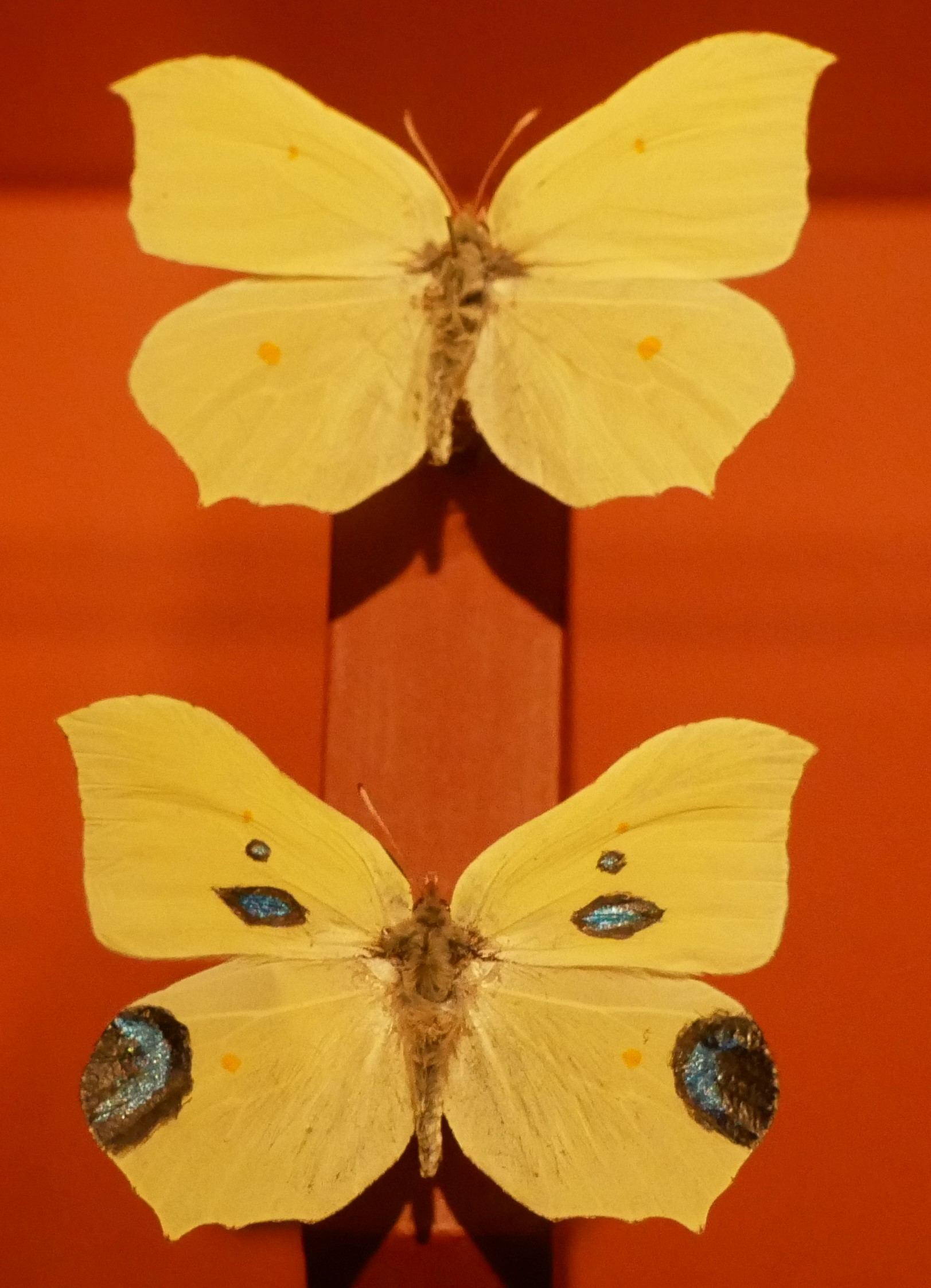
Gonepteryx rhamni: a specimen with spots painted on was named Papilio ecclipsis in Centuria Insectorum

One of the species described in Centuria Insectorum was "Papilio ecclipsis". This was based on a specimen sent by William Charlton to James Petiver in 1702, who wrote: "It exactly resembles our English Brimstone Butterfly (R. Rhamni), were it not for those black spots and apparent blue moons on the lower wings. This is the only one I have seen." Carl Linnaeus examined the butterfly, and named it Papilio ecclipsis in Centuria Insectorum Rariorum, including it in his Systema Naturae from the 12th edition (1767) onwards. It was not until 1793 that the hoax was discovered by Johan Christian Fabricius, who recognised that the dark patches had been painted on, and that the specimen was a common brimstone butterfly (now called Gonepteryx rhamni). Although the curator at the British Museum "indignantly stamped the specimen to pieces" when he found out, William Jones created two replicas to replace the lost specimen.

=== Species ===
The 102 species described in Centuria Insectorum were divided into seven sections, broadly corresponding with modern insect orders. Exceptions are that thrips (Thysanoptera), mantises (Mantodea) and Orthoptera were included in the Hemiptera, dragonflies (Odonata) were included in the Neuroptera, and the section called "Aptera" contains crustaceans rather than insects in the modern sense. Most of the names introduced in Centuria Insectorum are still in use, albeit in different genera; in a few cases, it is not clear what animal the name refers to. (Note: Linnaeus' orthography has been preserved here as far as possible, including the use of ſ – the long s.)

==== Coleoptera ====
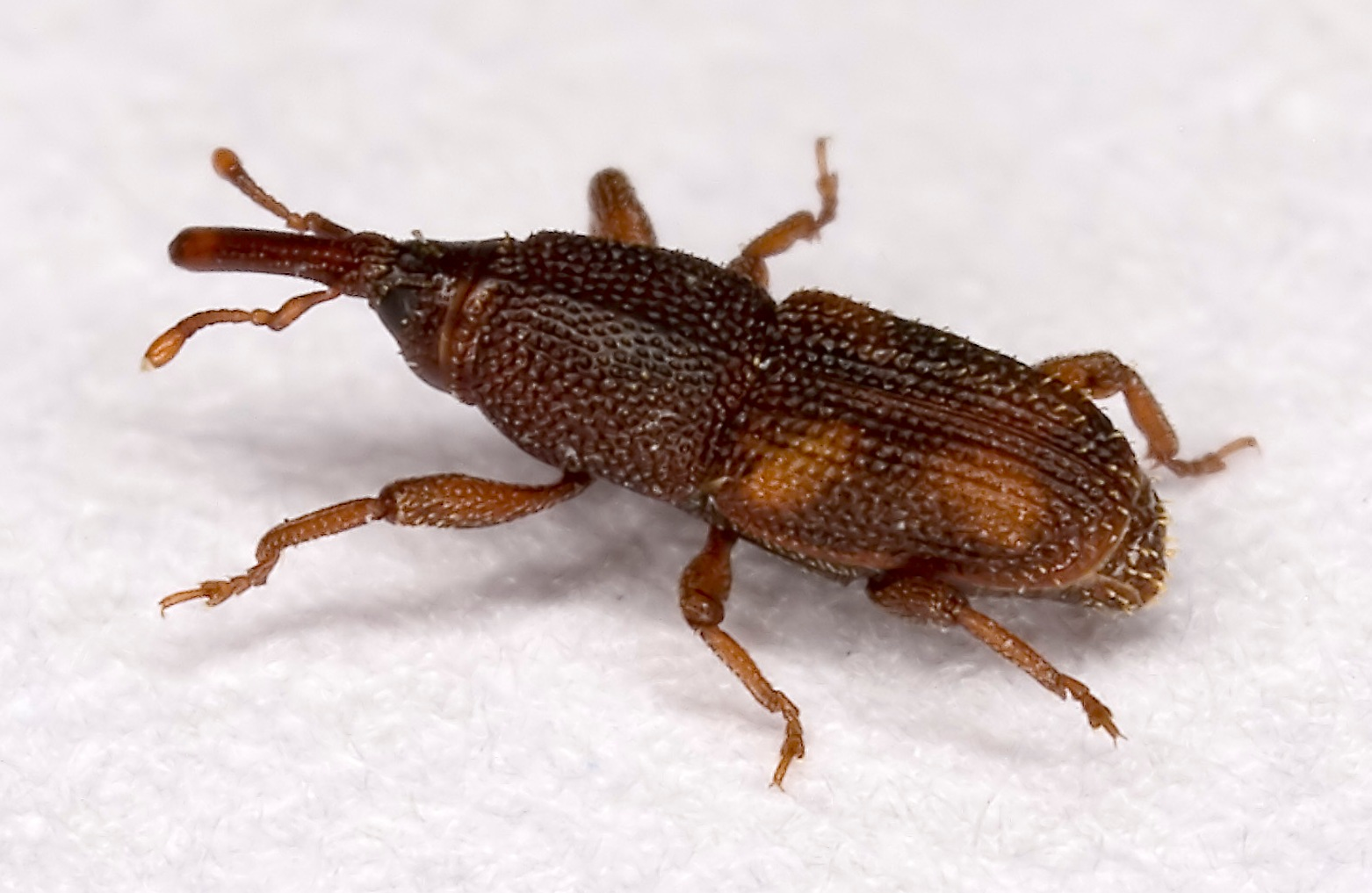
Sitophilus oryzae, named in Centuria Insectorum as Curculio oryza

| No. | Name in Centuria... | Status | Current name |
|---|---|---|---|
| 1 | SCARABÆUS Tityus | valid | Dynastes tityus |
| 2 | SCARABÆUS Molosſus (Note: Scarabæus Molosſus was previously included in the 10th edition of Systema Naturae (1758).) | valid | Catharsius molossus |
| 3 | SCARABÆUS ſurinamus | synonym | Rutela lineola |
| 4 | SCARABÆUS capreolus | valid | Lucanus capreolus |
| 5 | DERMESTES Gleditſiæ | valid | Caryobruchus gleditsiae |
| 6 | DERMESTES bactris | valid | Pachymerus bactris |
| 7 | CASSIDA ſpinifex | valid | Acromis spinifex |
| 8 | CASSIDA bipuſtulata | junior synonym | Stolas discoides |
| 9 | CASSIDA bicornis | valid | Omocerus bicornis |
| 10 | CASSIDA leucophæa | | |
| 11 | COCCINELLA ſangvinea | valid | Cycloneda sanguinea |
| 12 | COCCINELLA ſurinamenſis | junior synonym | Aegithus clavicornis |
| 13 | CHRYSOMELA gibboſa | valid | Gibbifer gibbosus |
| 14 | CHRYSOMELA undulata | valid | Phyllocharis undulata |
| 15 | CHRYSOMELA caſtanea | | |
| 16 | CHRYSOMELA Gorteriæ | valid | Cryptocephalus gorteriae |
| 17 | CHRYSOMELA octopunctata | | |
| 18 | CHRYSOMELA punctatiſſima | | |
| 19 | CURCULIO oryza | valid | Sitophilus oryzae |
| 20 | CURCULIO ſurinamenſis | valid | Curculio surinamensis |
| 21 | CANTHARIS bicolor | valid (Note: At least two other species have been named "Cantharis bicolor". Cantharis bicolor Panzer, 1797 is a synonym of Cantharis pallida Goeze, 1777, while Cantharis bicolor Herbst, 1784 is a synonym of Cantharis thoracica (Olivier, 1790).) | Thonalmus bicolor |
| 22 | CICINDELA æquinoctialis | valid | Pheropsophus aequinoctialis |
| 23 | CICINDELA carolina | valid | Tetracha carolina |
| 24 | ELATER ligneus | valid | Semiotus ligneus |
| 25 | MELOE Chryſomeloides | valid | Nemognatha chrysomeloides |
| 26 | TENEBRIO Gigas (Note: Linnaeus later named a species Tenebrio gigas in the 12th edition of Systema Naturae (1767), but corrected it to Tenebrio gages in the erratum. That species is now Blaps gages, which may be synonymous with Blaps kollari Seidlitz.) | | |

==== Hemiptera ====
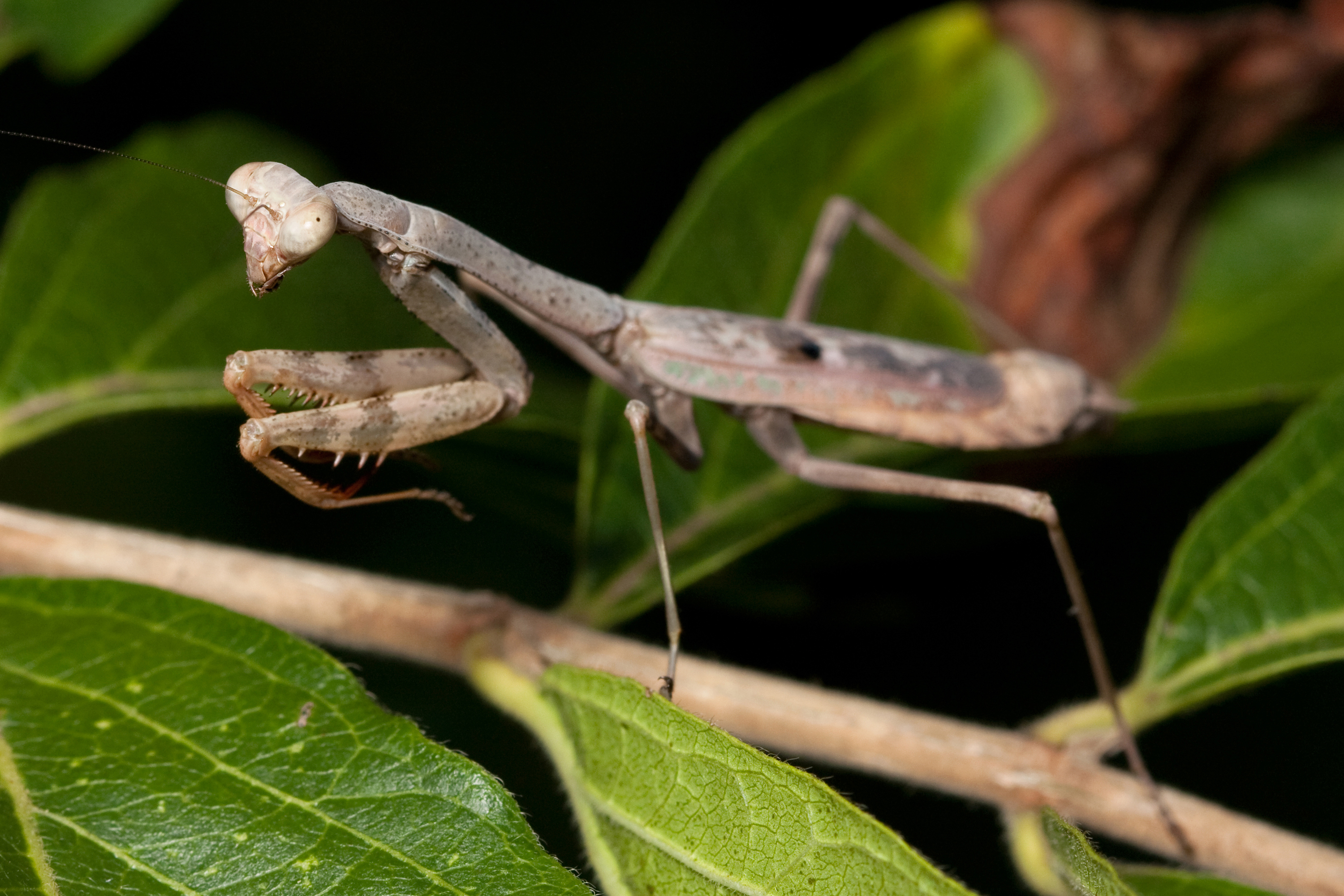
Stagmomantis carolina, named in Centuria Insectorum as Gryllus carolinus

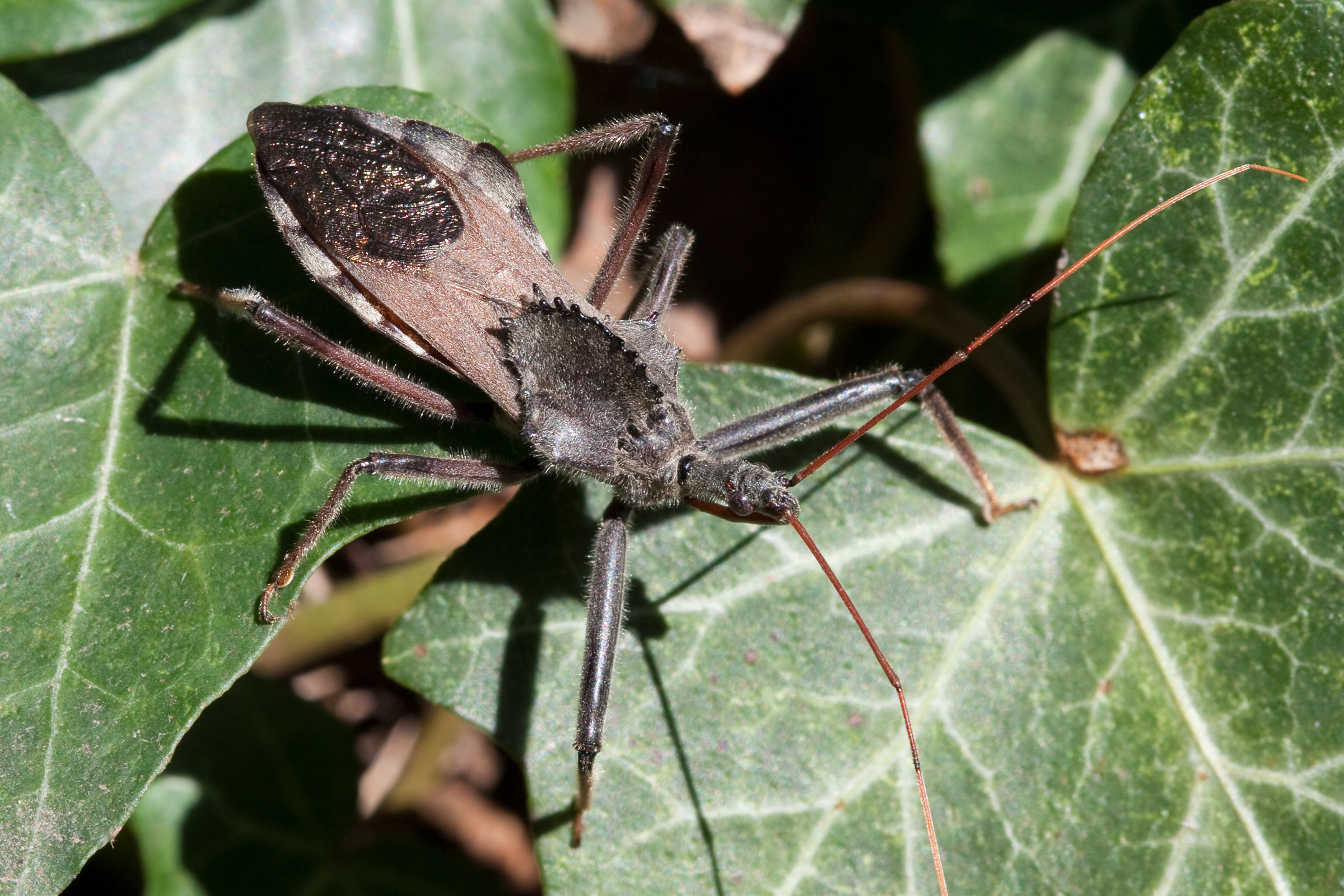
Arilus cristatus, named in Centuria Insectorum as Cimex cristatus

| No. | Name in Centuria... | Status | Current name |
|---|---|---|---|
| 27 | GRYLLUS unicornis (Note: Linnaeus later referred to this species as Mantis pectinicornis.) | synonym | Empusa pennicornis |
| 28 | GRYLLUS carolinus | valid | Stagmomantis carolina |
| 29 | GRYLLUS irroratus | synonym | Stagmomantis carolina |
| 30 | GRYLLUS Lunus | valid | Monachidium lunum |
| 31 | GRYLLUS Cinerarius | synonym | Pterochroza ocellata |
| 32 | GRYLLUS brachypterus / GRYLLUS necydaloides (Note: Appears as "GRYLLUS brachypterus" in Centuria Insectorum Rariorum and as "GRYLLUS necydaloides" in Centuria Insectorum.) | valid / junior synonym | Pseudophasma brachypterum |
| 33 | GRYLLUS javanus | junior synonym | Mecopoda elongata |
| 34 | GRYLLUS perſpicillatus | valid | Ommatolampis perspicillata |
| 35 | GRYLLUS ſpinuloſus | valid | Eugaster spinulosa |
| 36 | GRYLLUS ſuccinctus | valid | Nomadacris succincta |
| 37 | GRYLLUS brevicornis | valid | Metaleptea brevicornis |
| 38 | GRYLLUS convolutus | valid | Miogryllus convolutus |
| 39 | CICADA flammea | valid | Zanna flammea |
| 40 | CICADA truncata | valid | Oryxa truncata |
| 41 | CIMEX ictericus | valid | Euschistus ictericus |
| 42 | CIMEX criſtatus | valid | Arilus cristatus |
| 43 | CIMEX ſcaber | valid | Acanthocoris scaber |
| 44 | CIMEX ſuccinctus | valid | Largus succinctus |
| 45 | CIMEX hæmorrhous | valid | Leptoscelis haemorrhous |
| 46 | CIMEX nobilis | valid | Calliphara nobilis |
| 47 | COCCUS capenſis | valid | Conchaspis capensis |
| 48 | TRIPS paradoxa | valid | Thrips paradoxa |

==== Lepidoptera ====
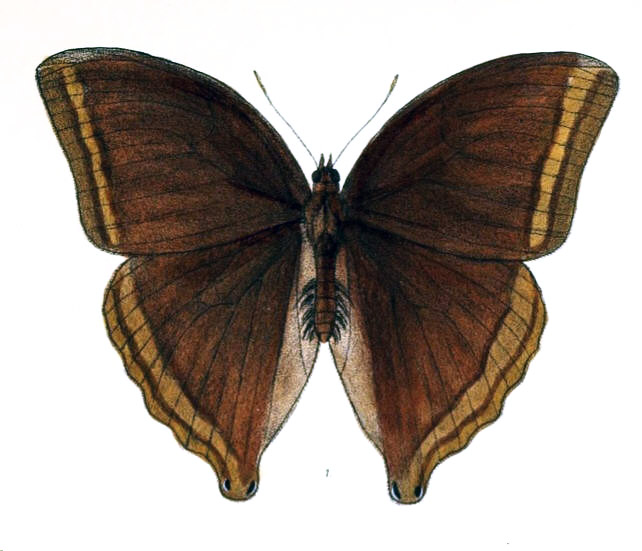
Amathusia phidippus, named in Centuria Insectorum as Papilio phidippus

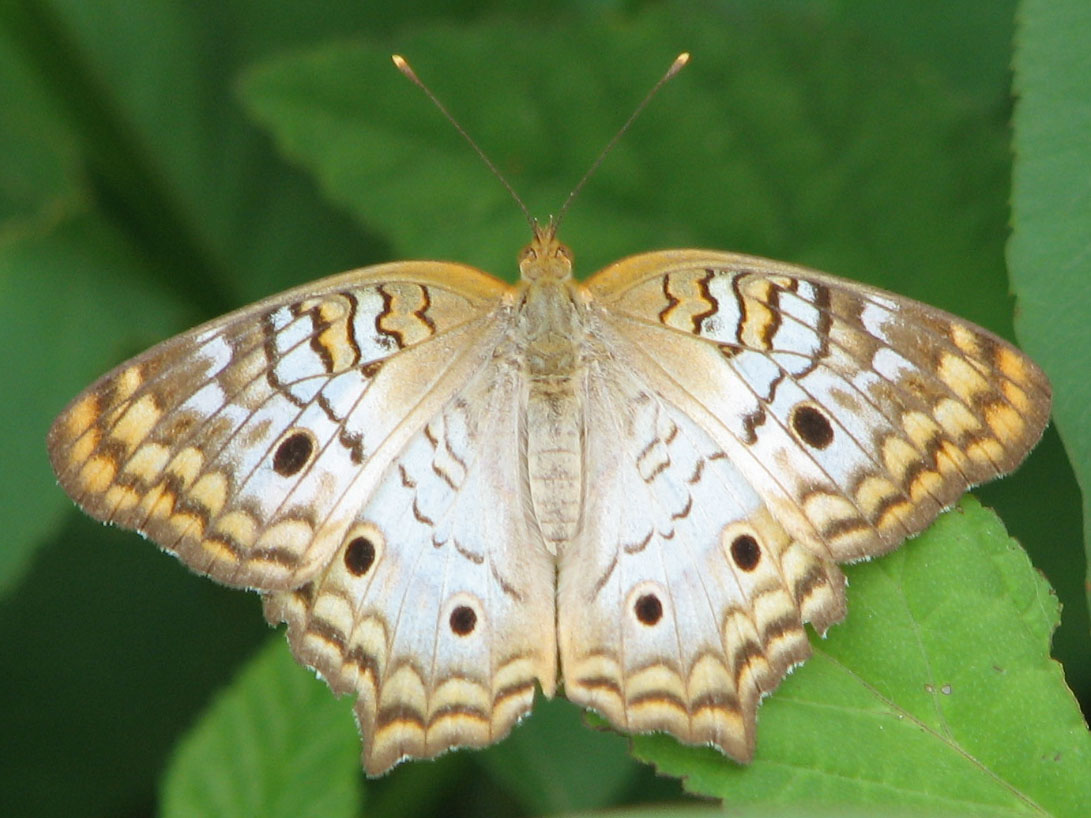
Anartia jatrophae, named in Centuria Insectorum as Papilio Jatrophæ

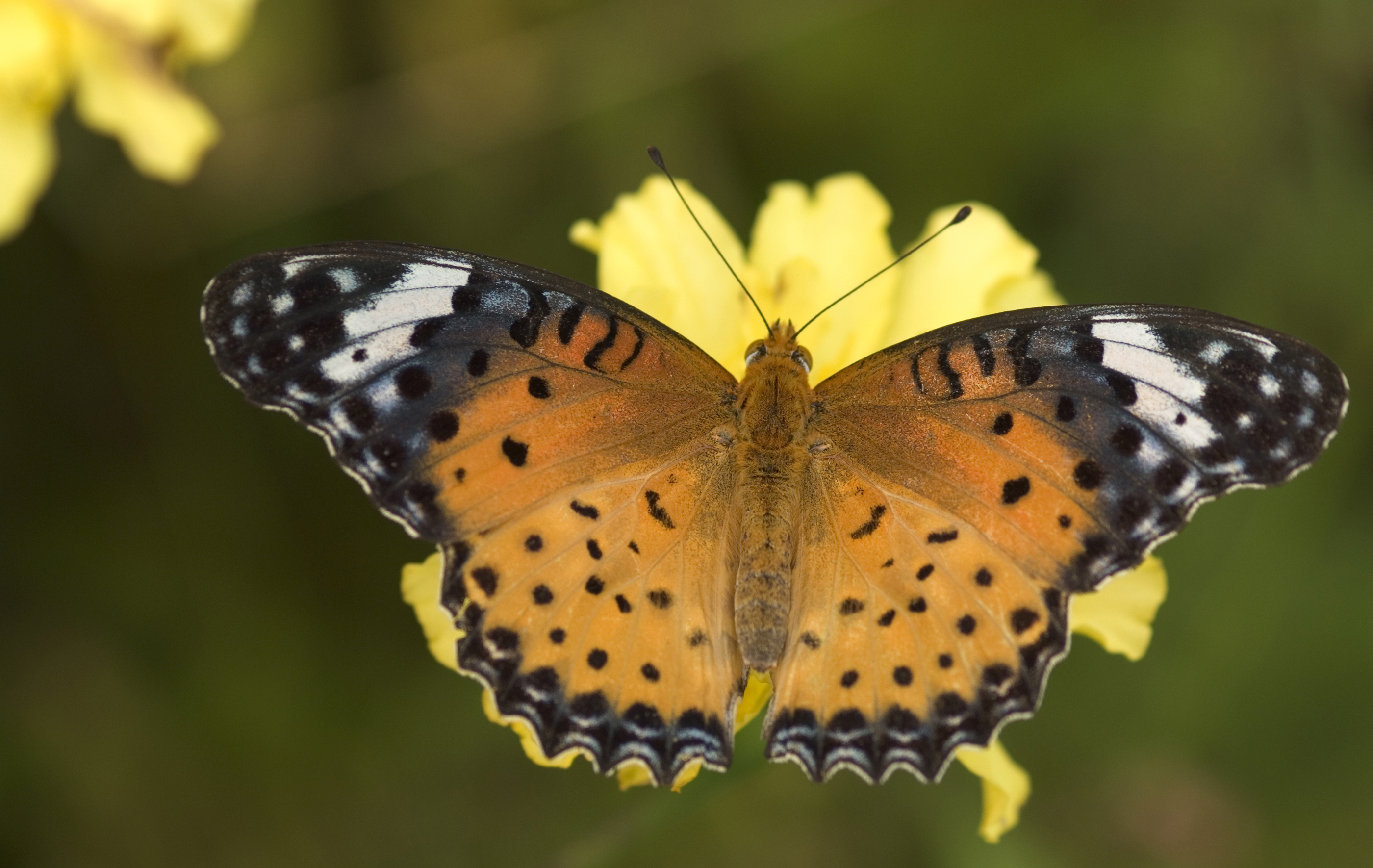
Argynnis hyperbius, named in Centuria Insectorum as Papilio Hyperbius

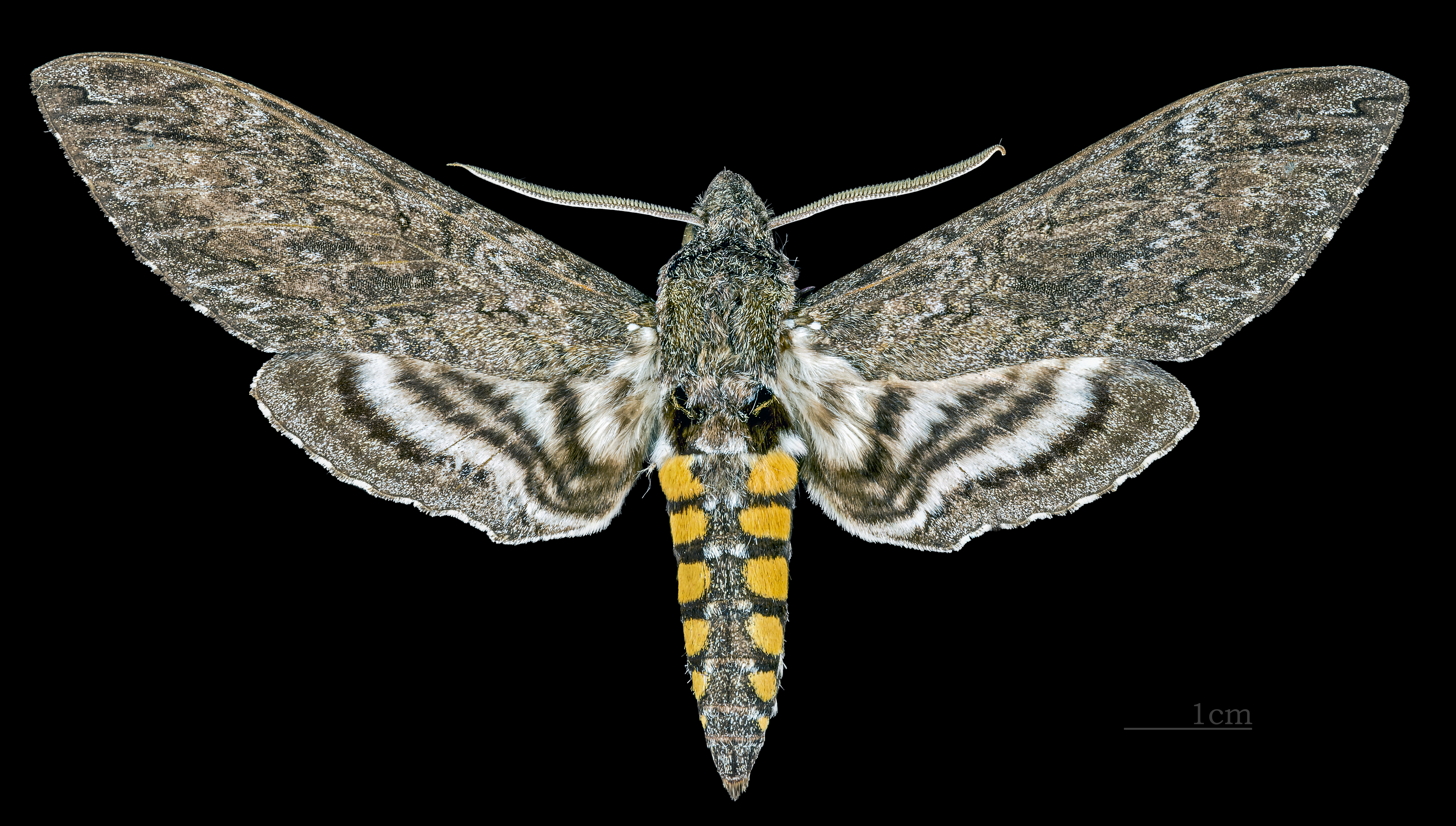
Manduca sexta, named in Centuria Insectorum as Sphinx sexta

| No. | Name in Centuria... | Status | Current name |
|---|---|---|---|
| 49 | PAPILIO Ægiſthus | junior synonym | Graphium agamemnon |
| 50 | PAPILIO Polydorus | valid | Atrophaneura polydorus |
| 51 | PAPILIO Orontes | valid | Alcides orontes |
| 52 | PAPILIO Phidippus | valid | Amathusia phidippus |
| 53 | PAPILIO Medon | valid | Euphaedra medon |
| 54 | PAPILIO Mneme | valid | Melinaea mneme |
| 55 | PAPILIO Ædea | valid | Eterusia aedea |
| 56 | PAPILIO Melite | valid | Enantia melite |
| 57 | PAPILIO Scylla | valid | Catopsilia scylla |
| 58 | PAPILIO Polybe | valid | Atlides polybe |
| 59 | PAPILIO Philea | valid | Phoebis philea |
| 60 | PAPILIO Philomela | valid | Ypthima philomela |
| 61 | PAPILIO Electo | valid | Colias electo |
| 62 | PAPILIO Helcita | valid | Aletis helcita |
| 63 | PAPILIO Idea | valid | Idea idea |
| 64 | PAPILIO Strilidore | nomen dubium | unknown |
| 65 | PAPILIO Eurydice | valid | Satyrodes eurydice |
| 66 | PAPILIO Demophile | valid | Itaballia demophile |
| 67 | PAPILIO ecclipſis | hoax | Gonepteryx rhamni |
| 68 | PAPILIO Canace | valid | Kaniska canace |
| 69 | PAPILIO Hypermneſtra | valid | Elymnias hypermnestra |
| 70 | PAPILIO Talaus | junior synonym | Entheus priassus |
| 71 | PAPILIO Ariadne | valid | Ariadne ariadne |
| 72 | PAPILIO Atlites | valid | Junonia atlites |
| 73 | PAPILIO Jatrophæ | valid | Anartia jatrophae |
| 74 | PAPILIO Dido | valid | Philaethria dido |
| 75 | PAPILIO Hyperbius | valid | Argynnis hyperbius |
| 76 | PAPILIO Cydippe | junior homonym; rejected (Note: Papilio cydippe Linnaeus, 1763 is a junior homonym of Papilio cydippe Linnaeus, 1761, both of which are rendered invalid by the preservation of Papilio cydippe Linnaeus, 1767.) | Cethosia cydippe |
| 77 | PAPILIO Peleus | junior synonym | Entheus priassus |
| 78 | PAPILIO Actorion | valid | Bia actorion |
| 79 | PAPILIO Arcius | valid | Rhetus arcius |
| 80 | PAPILIO Augias | valid | Telicota augias |
| 81 | SPHINX ſexta | valid | Manduca sexta |
| 82 | PHALÆNA gangis | valid | Creatonotos gangis |
| 83 | PHALÆNA Phalonia | valid | Eudocima phalonia |
| 84 | PHALÆNA heteroclita | nomen dubium | Enantia melite? |

==== Neuroptera ====
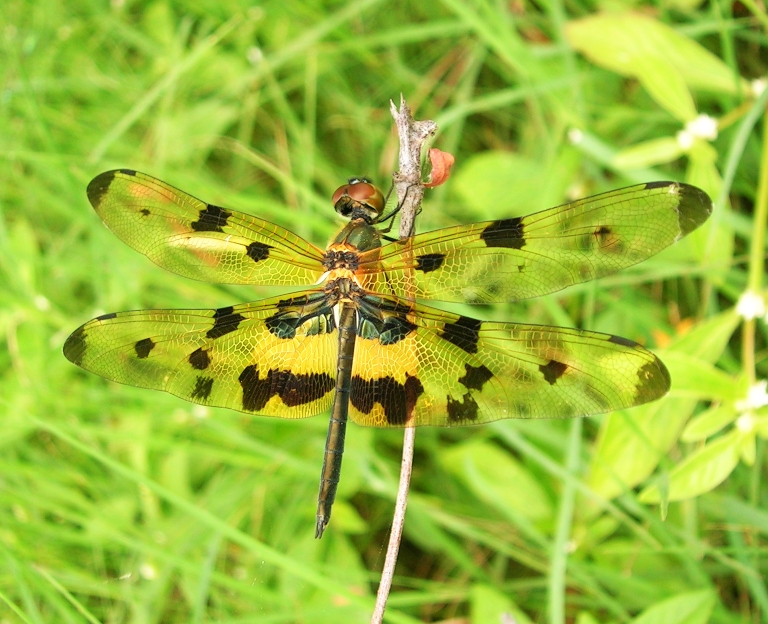
Rhyothemis variegata, named in Centuria Insectorum as Libellula variegata

| No. | Name in Centuria... | Status | Current name |
|---|---|---|---|
| 85 | LIBELLULA carolina | valid | Tramea carolina |
| 86 | LIBELLULA variegata | valid | Rhyothemis variegata |
| 87 | HEMEROBIUS pectinicornis | valid | Chauliodes pectinicornis |

==== Hymenoptera ====
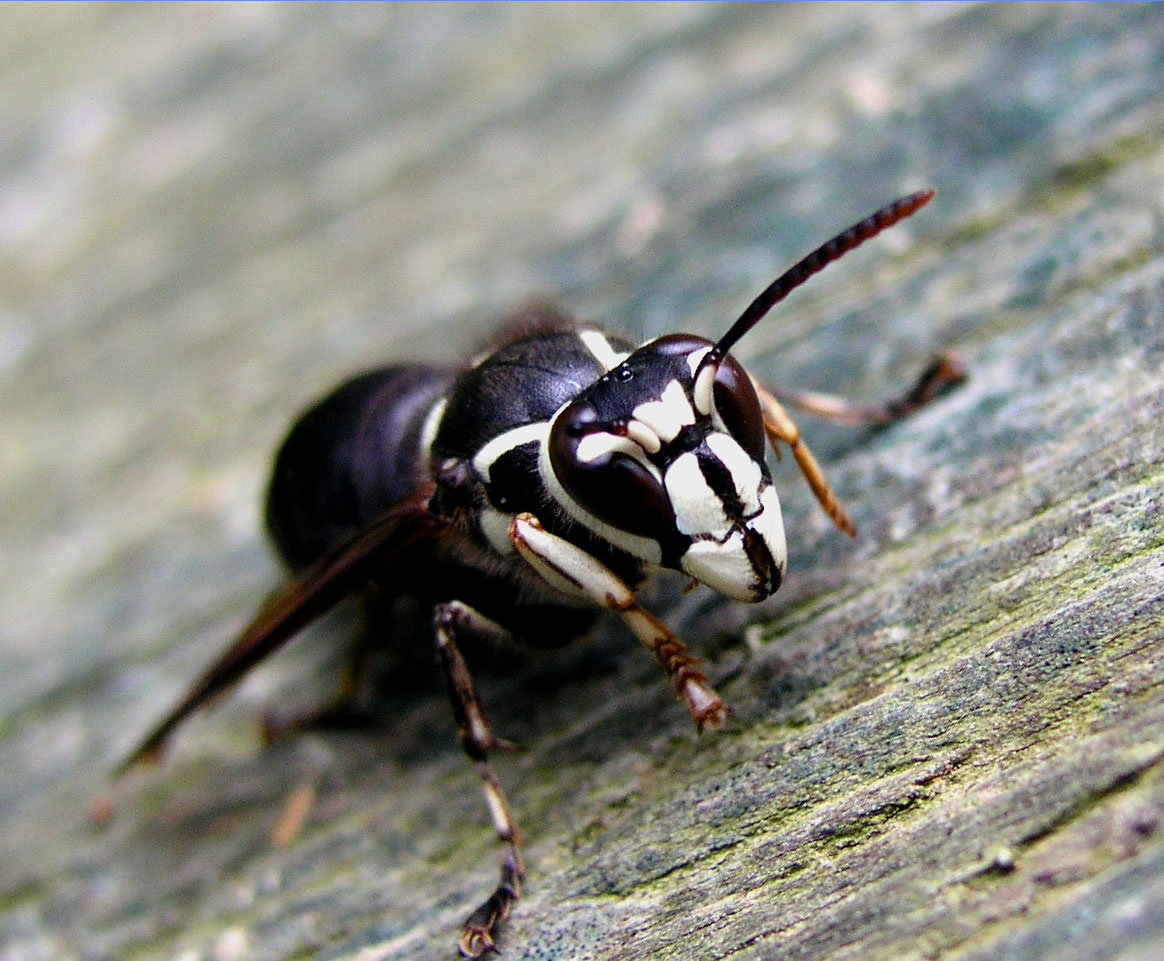
Dolichovespula maculata, named in Centuria Insectorum as Vespa maculata

| No. | Name in Centuria... | Status | Current name |
|---|---|---|---|
| 88 | SIREX columba | valid | Tremex columba |
| 89 | SPHEX pensylvanica | valid | Sphex pensylvanicus |
| 90 | SPHEX cærulea | junior homonym of Sphex caerulea Linnaeus, 1758 (= Entypus caeruleus) | Chalybion californicum |
| 91 | VESPA maculata | valid | Dolichovespula maculata |
| 92 | VESPA quadridens | valid | Monobia quadridens |
| 93 | VESPA annularis | valid | Polistes annularis |
| 94 | FORMICA binodis (Note: Formica binodis Fabricius, 1775 is a different species, now called Messor barbarus.) | junior synonym | Tetramorium caespitum |

==== Diptera ====
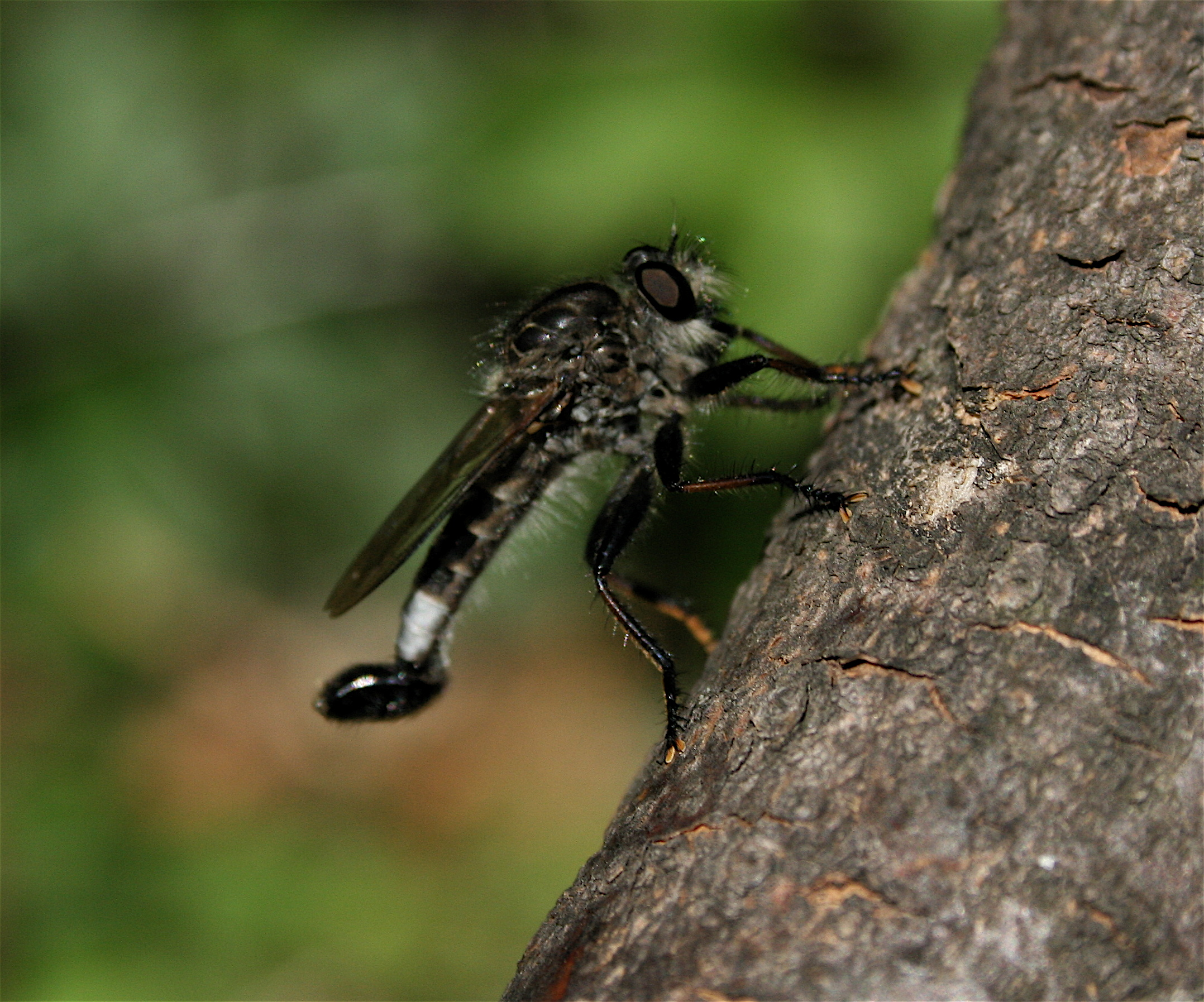
Efferia aestuans, named in Centuria Insectorum as Asilus æstuans

| No. | Name in Centuria... | Status | Current name |
|---|---|---|---|
| 95 | ASILUS æſtuans | valid | Efferia aestuans |

==== Aptera ====
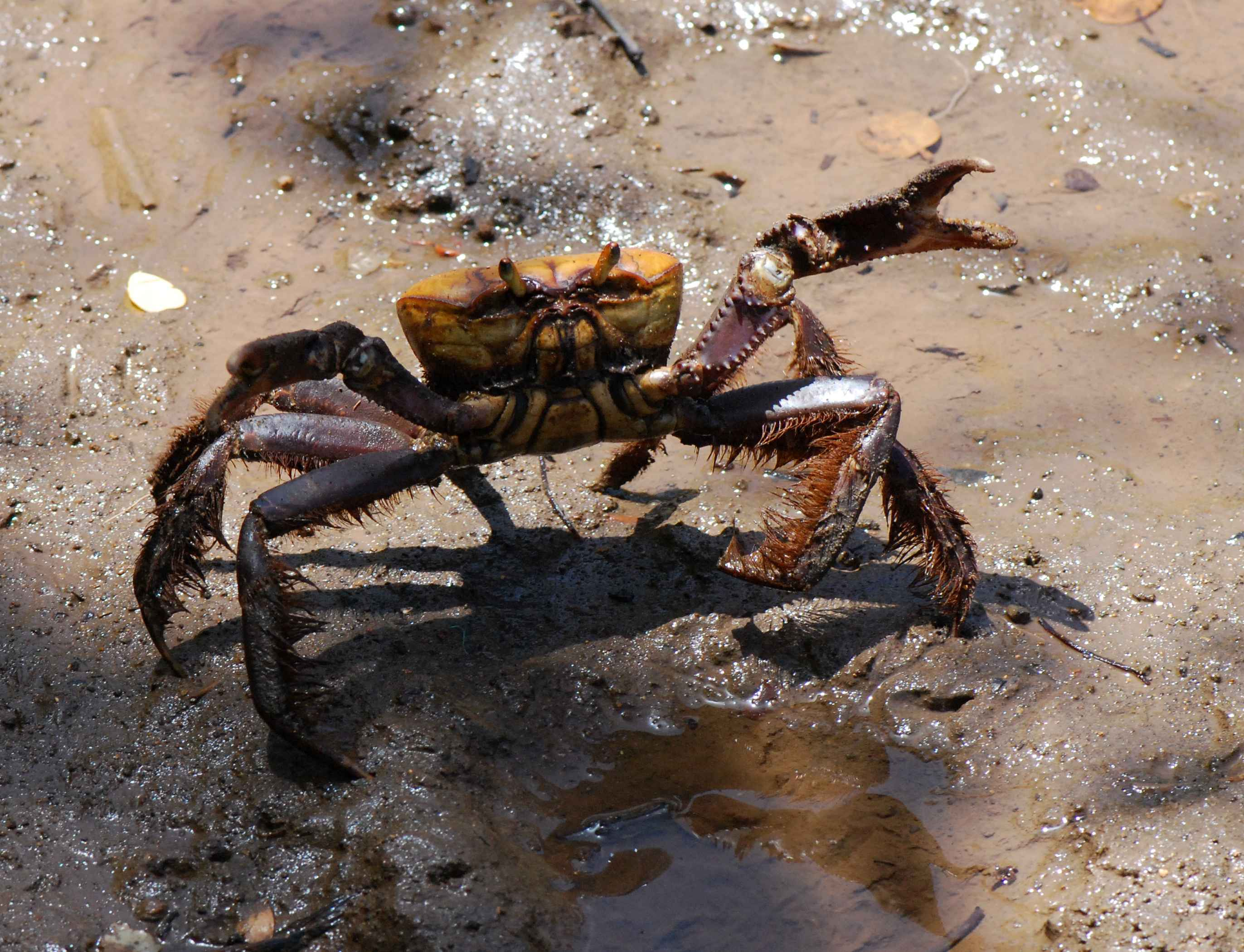
Ucides cordatus, named in Centuria Insectorum as Cancer cordatus

| No. | Name in Centuria... | Status | Current name |
|---|---|---|---|
| 96 | CANCER Dormia | valid | Dromia dormia |
| 97 | CANCER Vocans (Note: Appears as "CANCER Vocaus" in Centuria Insectorum Rariorum; both versions include an autoreference to the 10th edition of Systema Naturae.) | valid | Uca vocans |
| 98 | CANCER cordatus | valid | Ucides cordatus |
| 99 | CANCER epheliticus | valid | Hepatus epheliticus |
| 100 | CANCER paraſiticus | nomen dubium | Tumidotheres maculatus? |
| 101 | CANCER filiformis | nomen dubium | Caprella lobata? |
| 102 | ONISCUS linearis | valid | Idotea linearis |
