= Nemognatha chrysomeloides =

Scientific classification
- Kingdom: Animalia
- Phylum: Arthropoda
- Class: Insecta
- Order: Coleoptera
- Suborder: Polyphaga
- Infraorder: Cucujiformia
- Family: Meloidae
- Genus: Nemognatha
- Species: N. chrysomeloides

Binomial name
- Nemognatha chrysomeloides (Linnaeus, 1763)

Species of beetle

Nemognatha chrysomeloides is a species of oil beetle (Meloidae) endemic to Central and South America.

== Ecology ==
Nemognatha chrysomeloides is a parasite of Melitoma marginella and M. segmentaria from Mexico to Argentina. Both N. chrysomeloides and Melitoma are restricted to the same host plant – Ipomoea – and so the rate of parasitism may be comparatively high.

== Taxonomy ==
Nemognatha chrysomeloides was first described by Carl Linnaeus in his 1763 work Centuria Insectorum, under the name Meloe chrysomeloides. It is a very variable species, and as such, many synonyms have since been published:

- Cantharis chrysomeloides (Linnaeus, 1763): Thunberg, 1784
- Lytta chrysomeloides (Linnaeus, 1763): Schoenherr, 1817
- Nemognathus coeruleipennis Perty, 1830
- Nemognatha versicolor Chevrolat, 1834
- Nemognatha abdominalis Lucas in Laporte de Castelnau, 1859
- Nemognatha bicolor Lucas in Laporte de Castelnau, 1859 (non LeConte, 1853; nec Walker, 1866)
- Nematognatha lucasi Gemminger, 1870
- Nemognatha atra Beauregard, 1890 (non Zonitis atrum Schwartz, 1808; nec Gnathium atrum Dugès, 1889)
- Nemognatha coeruleipennis var. fulviventris Beauregard, 1890
- Nemognatha pallidicollis Beauregard, 1890
- Nemognatha violacea Beauregard, 1890
- Nemognatha beauregardi Pic, 1910 (replacement name for N. atra Beauregard, 1890)
- Zonitis chrysomeloides (Linnaeus, 1763): Denier, 1935
- Zonitis beauregardi (Pic, 1910): Blackwelder, 1945
- Nemognatha chrysomeloides ab. markli Kaszab, 1963
