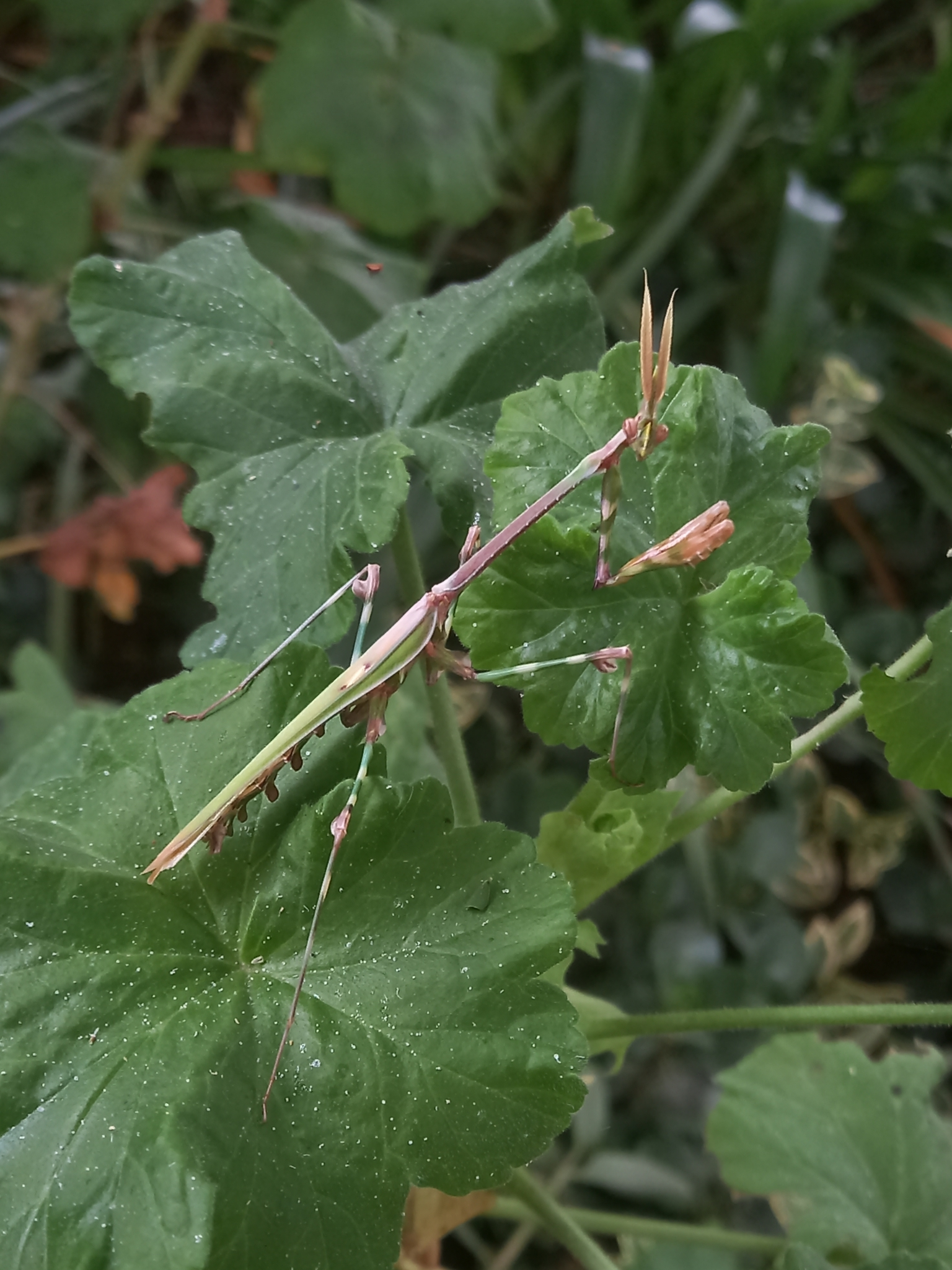
- Eastern Cape, South Africa, 2023

Scientific classification
- Kingdom: Animalia
- Phylum: Arthropoda
- Class: Insecta
- Order: Mantodea
- Family: Empusidae
- Genus: Empusa
- Species: E. binotata

Binomial name
- Empusa binotata Serville, 1839

= Empusa binotata =

Species of praying mantis

Empusa binotata is a species of praying mantis in family Empusidae.

== See also ==
- List of mantis genera and species
