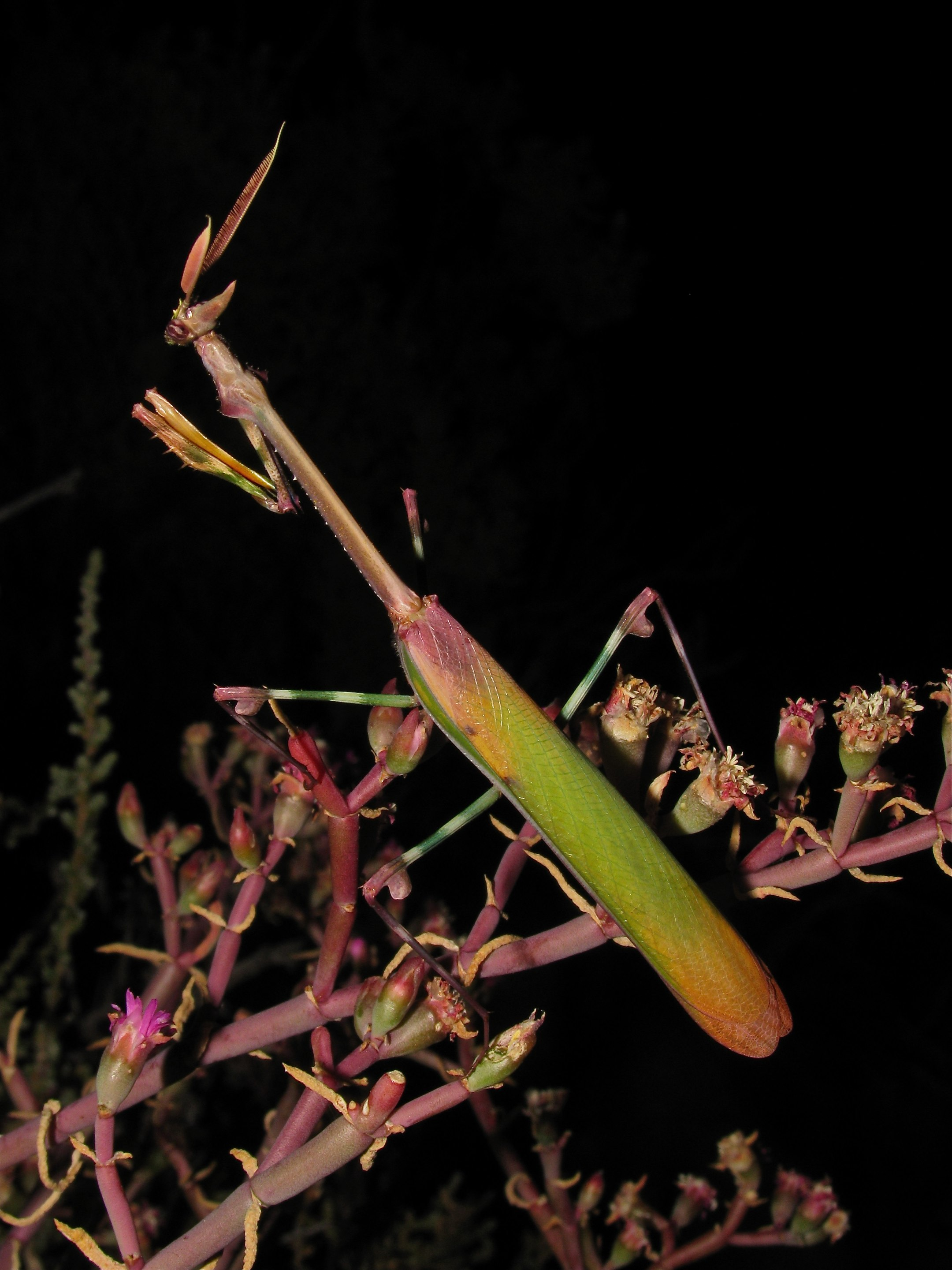
- Empusa guttula male imago, South Africa

Scientific classification
- Kingdom: Animalia
- Phylum: Arthropoda
- Class: Insecta
- Order: Mantodea
- Family: Empusidae
- Genus: Empusa
- Species: E. guttula

Binomial name
- Empusa guttula (Thunberg, 1815)

Synonyms
- Empusa dolosa Serville, 1839

= Empusa guttula =

Species of praying mantis

Empusa guttula is a species of praying mantis in the family Empusidae.

== See also ==
- List of mantis genera and species
