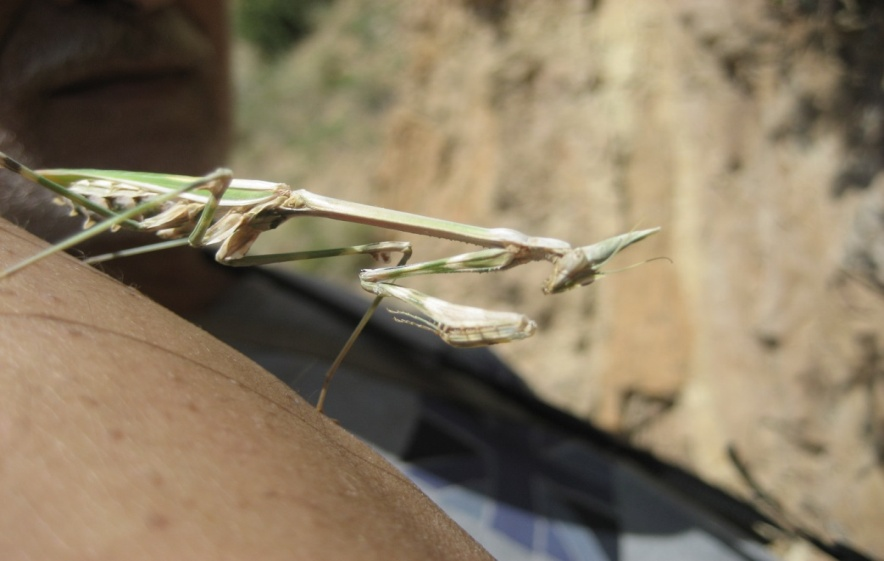
- Empusa pennicornis, Azerbaijan

Scientific classification
- Kingdom: Animalia
- Phylum: Arthropoda
- Clade: Pancrustacea
- Class: Insecta
- Order: Mantodea
- Family: Empusidae
- Genus: Empusa
- Species: E. pennicornis

Binomial name
- Empusa pennicornis Pallas, 1773

= Empusa pennicornis =

Species of praying mantis

Empusa pennicornis is a species of praying mantis in the family Empusidae.

== Subspecies ==
- E. p. angulata (Uzbekistan)
- E. p. baysunica (Kazakhstan and Uzbekistan)
- E. p. buharica (Uzbekistan)
- E. p. caputobtusa (Tajikistan)
- E. p. condarinica (Tajikistan)
- E. p. copetdagica (Turkmenistan)
- E. p. hodshamuminica (Tajikistán)
- E. p. iliense (Kazakhstan)
- E. p. longoapicale (Kazakhstan)
- E. p. longidorsa (Tajikistan)
- E. p. luppovae (Tajikistan)
- E. p. mujuncumica (Kazakhstan)
- E. p. orientalis (Kazakhstán)
- E. p. similis (Tajikistan)
- E. p. vidorsa (Kazakhstán and Tajikistán)

== See also ==
- List of mantis genera and species
