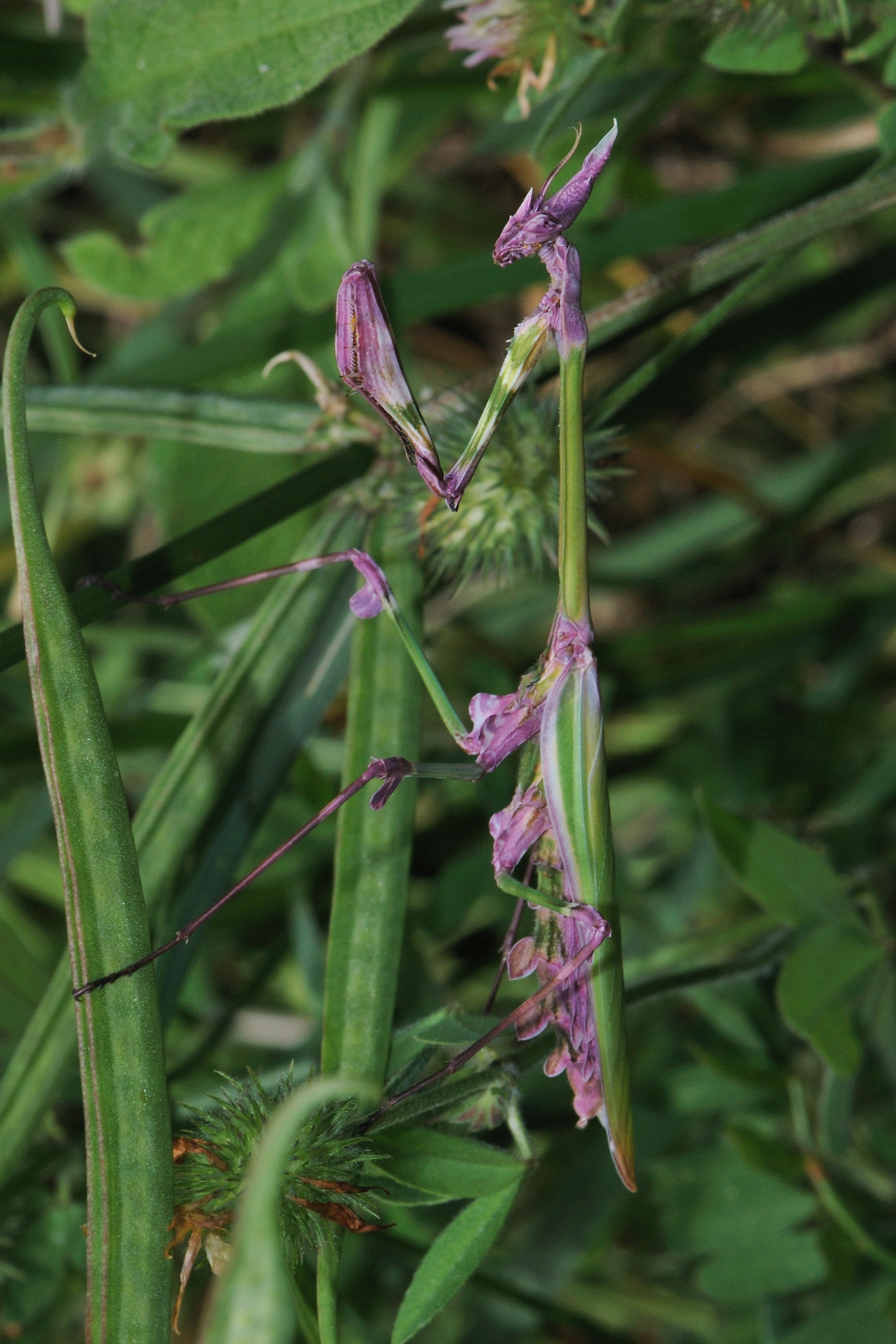
- E. fasciata female

Conservation status
- Data Deficient (IUCN 3.1)

Scientific classification
- Kingdom: Animalia
- Phylum: Arthropoda
- Clade: Pancrustacea
- Class: Insecta
- Order: Mantodea
- Family: Empusidae
- Genus: Empusa
- Species: E. fasciata

Binomial name
- Empusa fasciata Brulle, 1832

= Empusa fasciata =

Species of praying mantis

Empusa fasciata, commonly known as the devil's mare, is a species of praying mantis in the genus Empusa in the order Mantodea.

== Appearance ==
The praying mantis Empusa fasciata has a tapering head with a miter-like helmet, oval compound eyes, slender raptorial forelegs and a long thin thorax. E. fasciata often bends sharply upward at the abdomen, making the thorax appear even longer. The ventral abdomen and the femurs of the long thin walking legs have distinct lobules, which serve as camouflage. Due to its bizarre shape and the yellowish-green striped pattern of the legs, E. fasciata is well-camouflaged in vegetation, and is noticeable only when in motion.

== Distribution and life cycle ==
E. fasciata can be found from western Asia to the northeastern coast of Italy, in Morocco and southern Africa and appears most commonly in the southern Balkans. It prefers xerothermic sites. For instance, on the Adriatic coast, E. fasciata is found mainly on south-facing flysch and karst slopes, where Mantis religiosa can also occur. From Croatia to the bay of Trieste, E. fasciata reaches its adult stage in May. Mating can occur repeatedly, and females lay their eggs on vegetation. The adult males die soon after mating, and the females after oviposition. The nymphs hatch in July and overwinter in the pre-adult stage.

== Behavior ==
E. fasciata is a highly successful ambush predator. In the course of evolution, it has specialized in preying on fast flying insects, such as flies and bees. One reason for this preference may be that flying insects serve as nutritious food, which is important in the spring when there is a limited food supply. Adult females often perch on flowers, where they wait to prey on honeybees. Insect prey can be captured upon landing, or even during flight, due to the fast strike of E. fasciata and its ability to rotate its head and the two powerful raptorial forelegs more than 90° laterally, without moving the rest of its body. E. fasciata shows no evidence of being cannibalistic. Distinct rocking and jerking movements are executed, which not only serve as camouflage in moving vegetation, but also facilitate spatial vision with the aid of motion parallax or retinal image displacement.

Among the Mantodea, E. fasciata is a relatively good flyer. The fore and hind wings are moved up and down simultaneously, at a rate of about thirty wingbeats per second. E. fasciata is generally diurnal, however males fly at night to find pheromone plumes emitted by sexually active females. The odor receptors used for this are located on the long feathered antennae. There is evidence that flying males are able to avoid attack by bats due to the ability to detect sounds in the frequency range (50 – 100 kHz) used by bats for echolocation. The auditory system found in various mantis species is a single ear, and is situated in the ventral midline of the thorax near the junction with the abdomen.

== Gallery ==
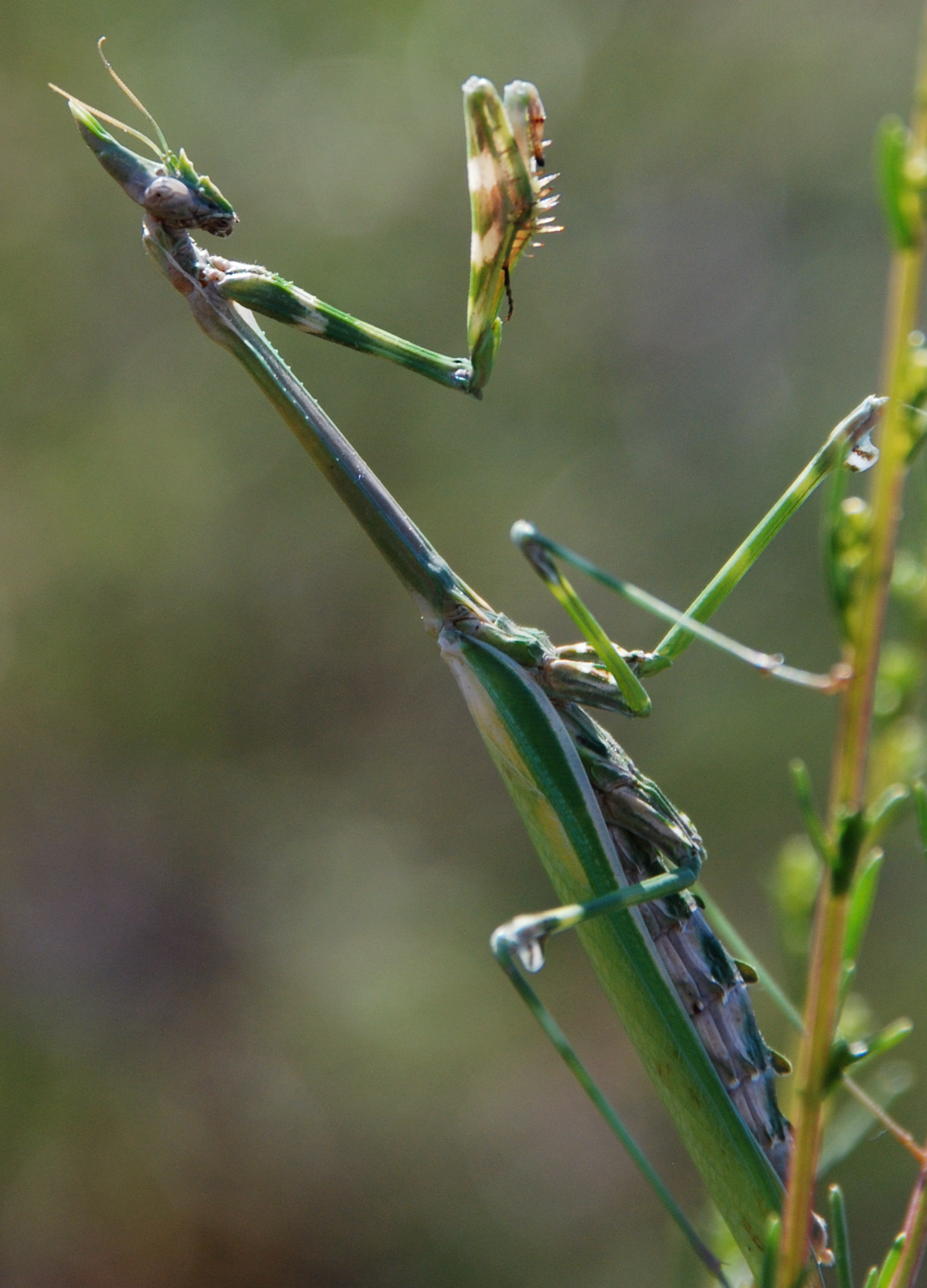
Adult female

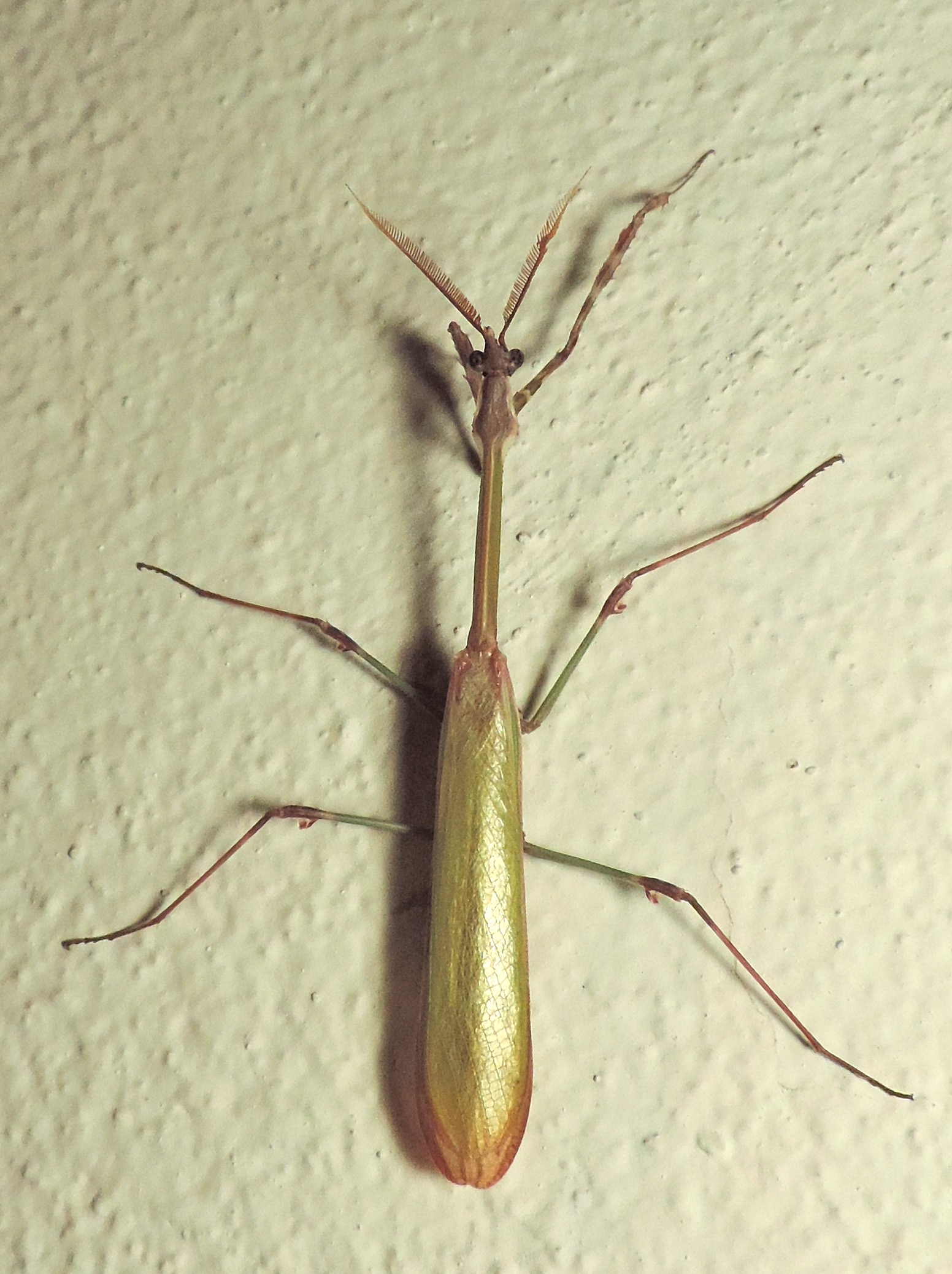
Adult male

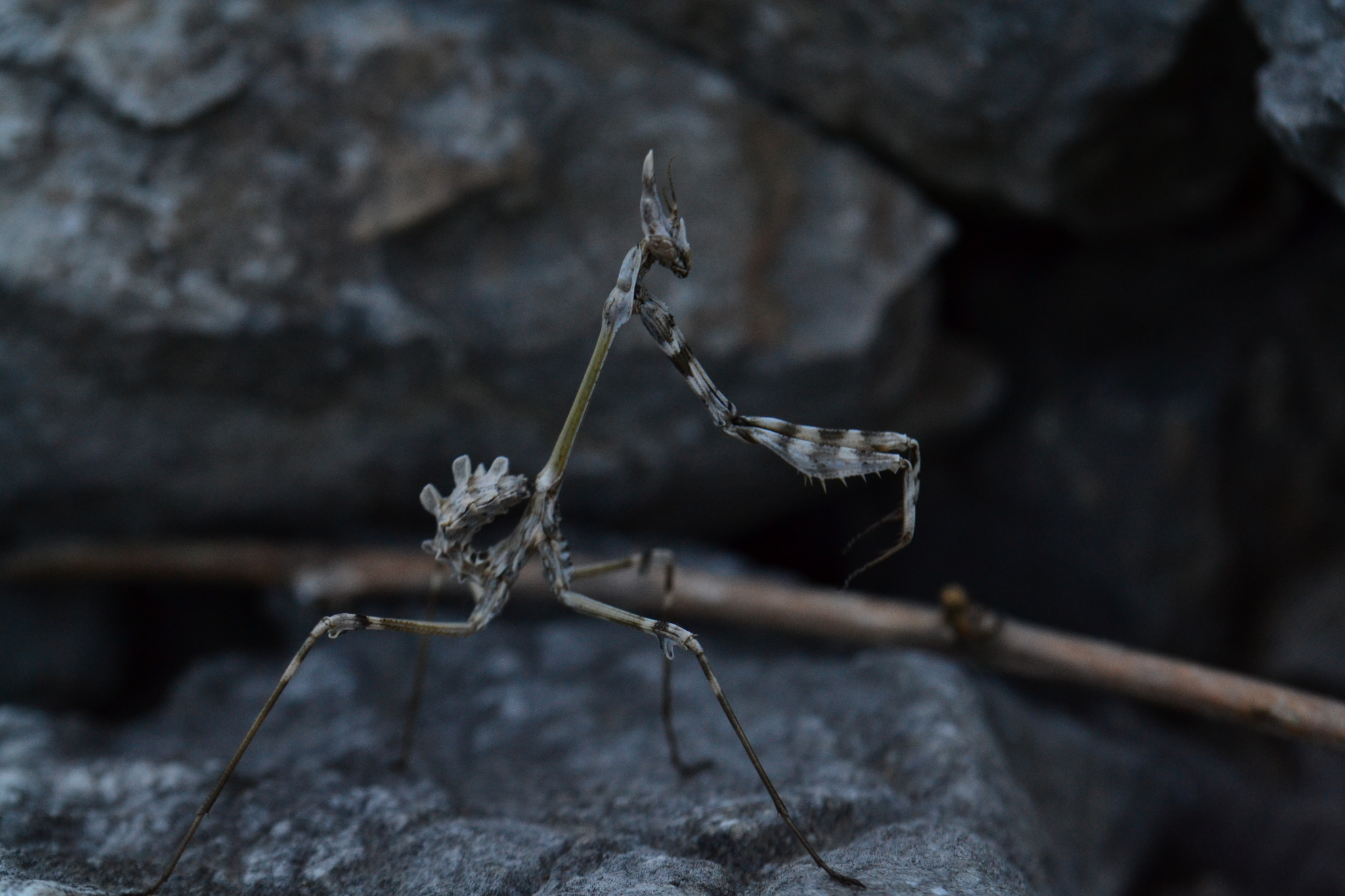
Gray nymph

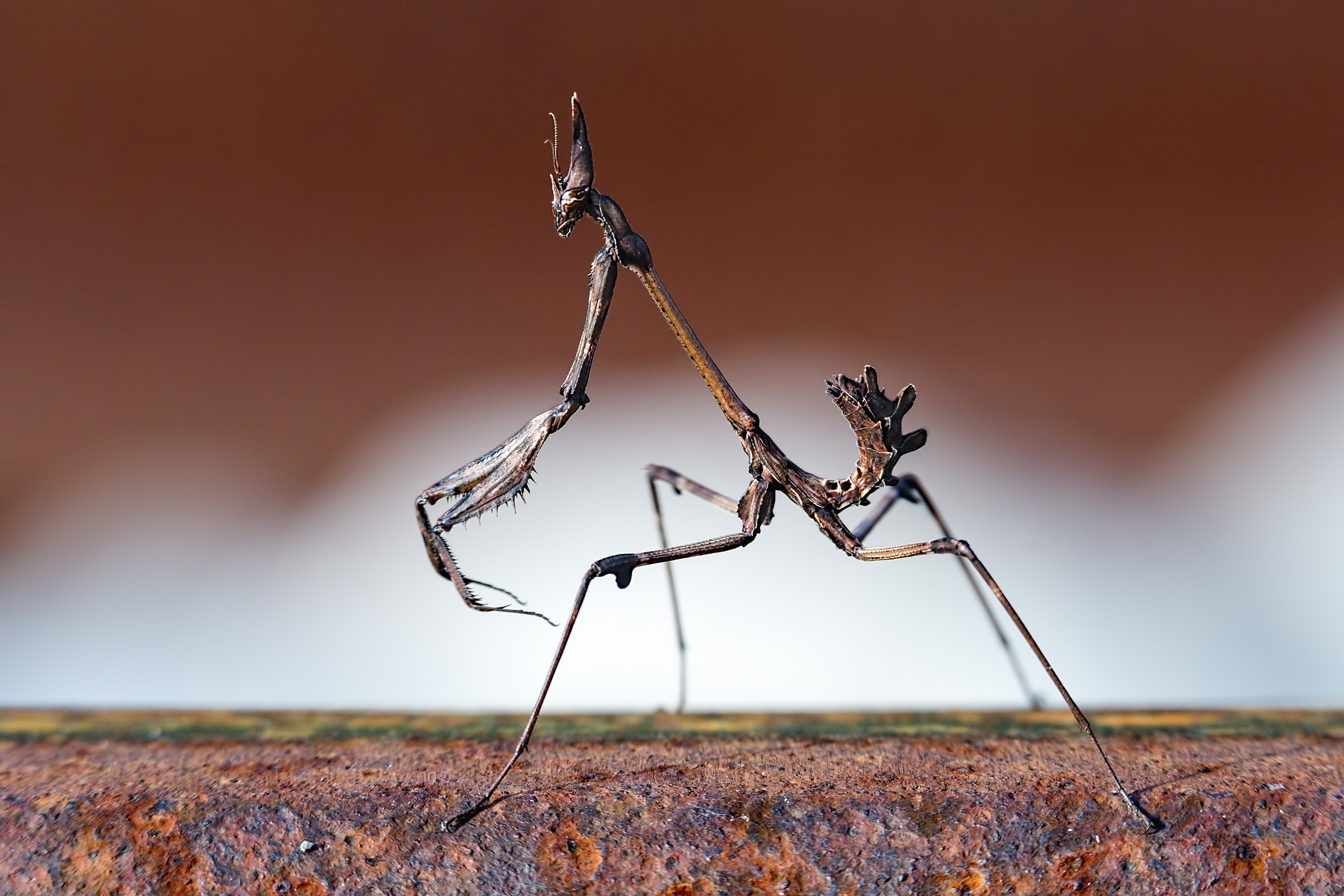
Brown nymph

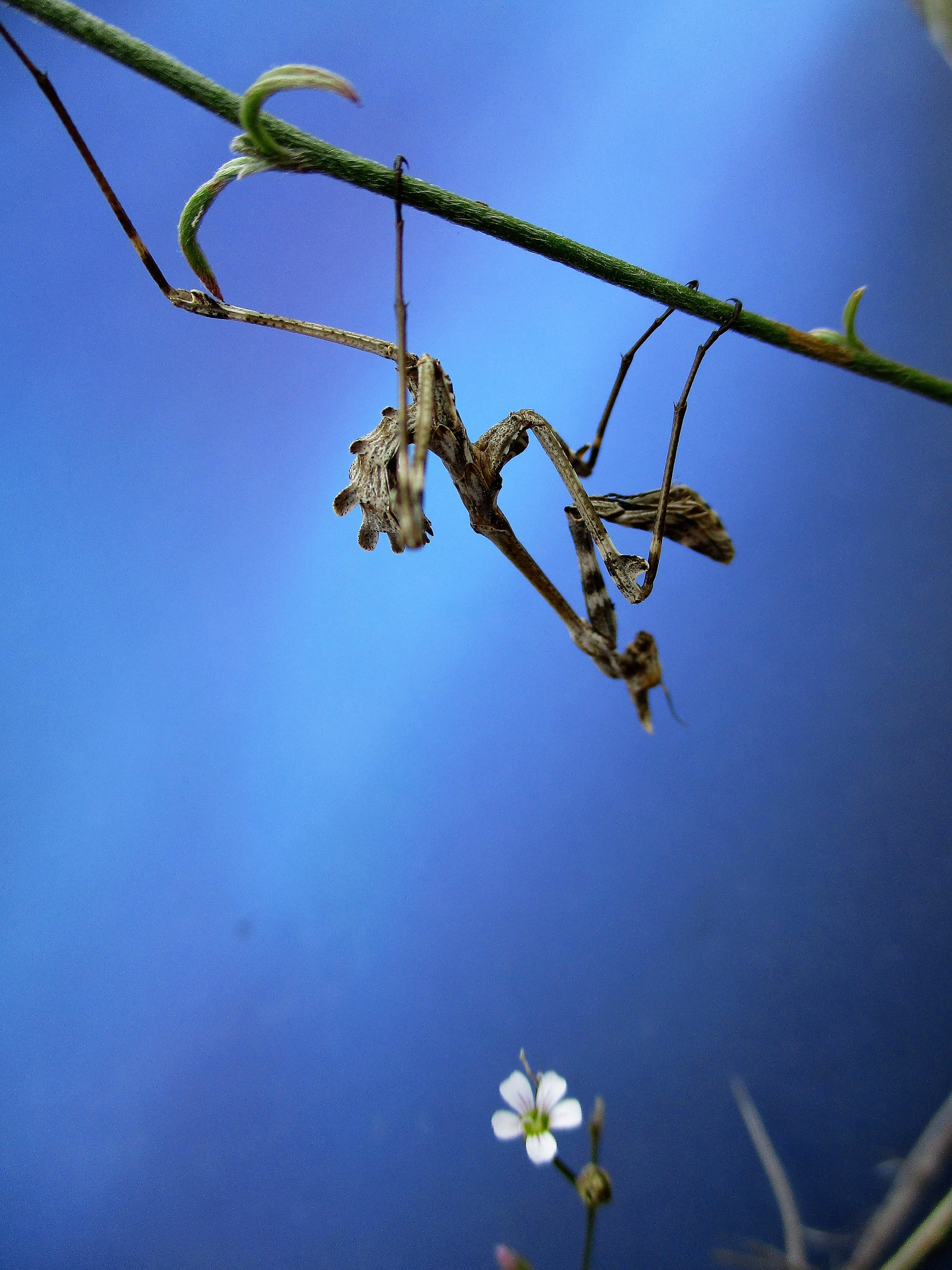
Green nymph

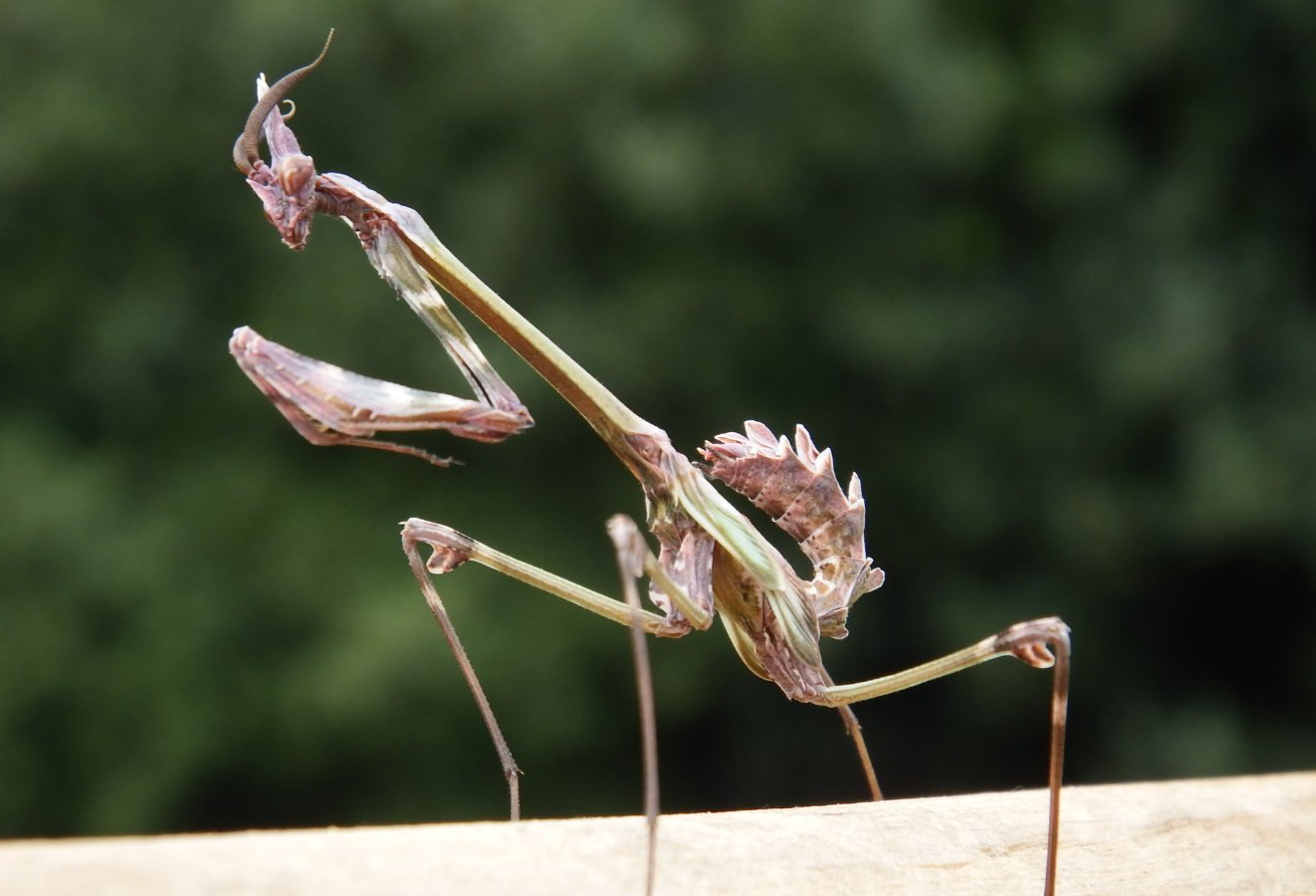
Pink nymph

== See also ==
- List of mantis genera and species
