= Idolum =

Idolum means an insubstantial image or a fallacy. It comes from the Latin word for apparition or religious idol. It can also refer to:

- The 2008 album of the Italian experimental metal band Ufomammut
- An invalid synonym of the mantis genus Idolomantis
