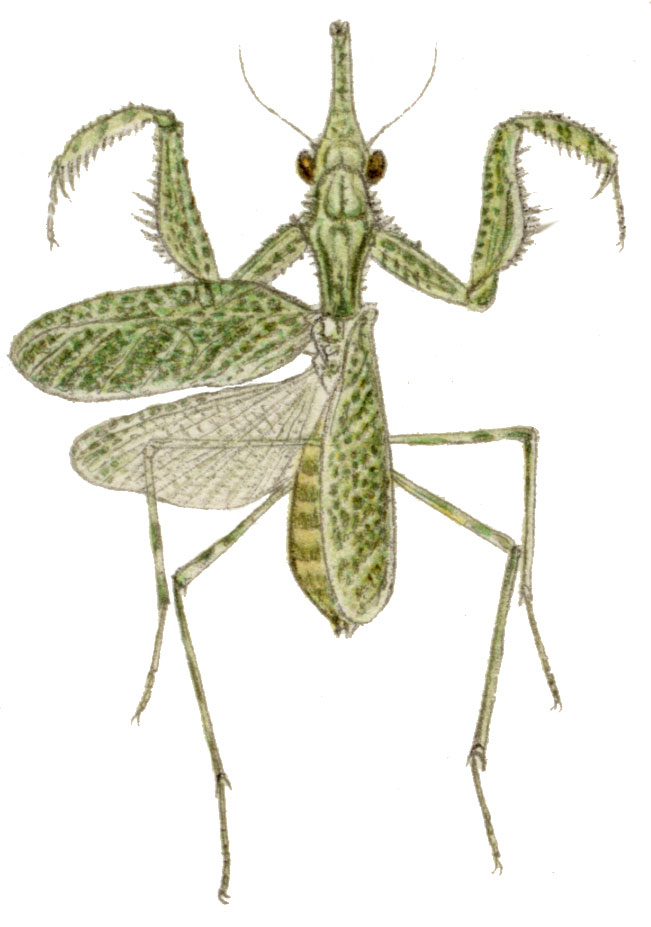
- Blepharodes cornutus female

Scientific classification
- Kingdom: Animalia
- Phylum: Arthropoda
- Clade: Pancrustacea
- Class: Insecta
- Order: Mantodea
- Family: Empusidae
- Genus: Blepharodes
- Species: B. cornutus

Binomial name
- Blepharodes cornutus (Schulthess, 1894)

= Blepharodes cornutus =

Species of praying mantis

Blepharodes cornutus, the horned blepharodes, is a species of mantis in the genus Blepharodes in the order Mantodea.

== See also ==
- List of mantis genera and species
