= Gongylus pauperatus =

Scientific classification
- Domain: Eukaryota
- Kingdom: Animalia
- Phylum: Arthropoda
- Class: Insecta
- Order: Mantodea
- Family: Empusidae
- Genus: Gongylus
- Species: G. pauperatus

Binomial name
- Gongylus pauperatus Fabricius, 1739

Species of praying mantis

Gongylus pauperatus is an praying mantis in the family Empusidae. Its generic name Gongylus means "roundish" in Greek.

== Distribution ==
This species is found in the Mediterranean region of France.
