= Gongylus (disambiguation) =

Gongylus or Gongylos (γογγύλος) may refer to:

- Gongylus of Eretria, the agent by whom the Spartan general Pausanias communicated with Xerxes I of Persia in 477 BCE
- Gongylus of Corinth, a captain who reinforced Syracuse in 414 BCE at a crucial point of the Sicilian Expedition
- Gongylus, a genus of praying mantises in the family Empusidae
- Gongylus, a genus of skinks in the family Scincidae

== See also ==
- Gongylodes (γογγυλώδης)
