= Empusa longicollis =

Scientific classification
- Kingdom: Animalia
- Phylum: Arthropoda
- Class: Insecta
- Order: Mantodea
- Family: Empusidae
- Genus: Empusa
- Species: E. longicollis

Binomial name
- Empusa longicollis Ramme, 1950

Species of praying mantis

Empusa longicollis is a species of praying mantis in the family Empusidae.

== See also ==
- List of mantis genera and species
