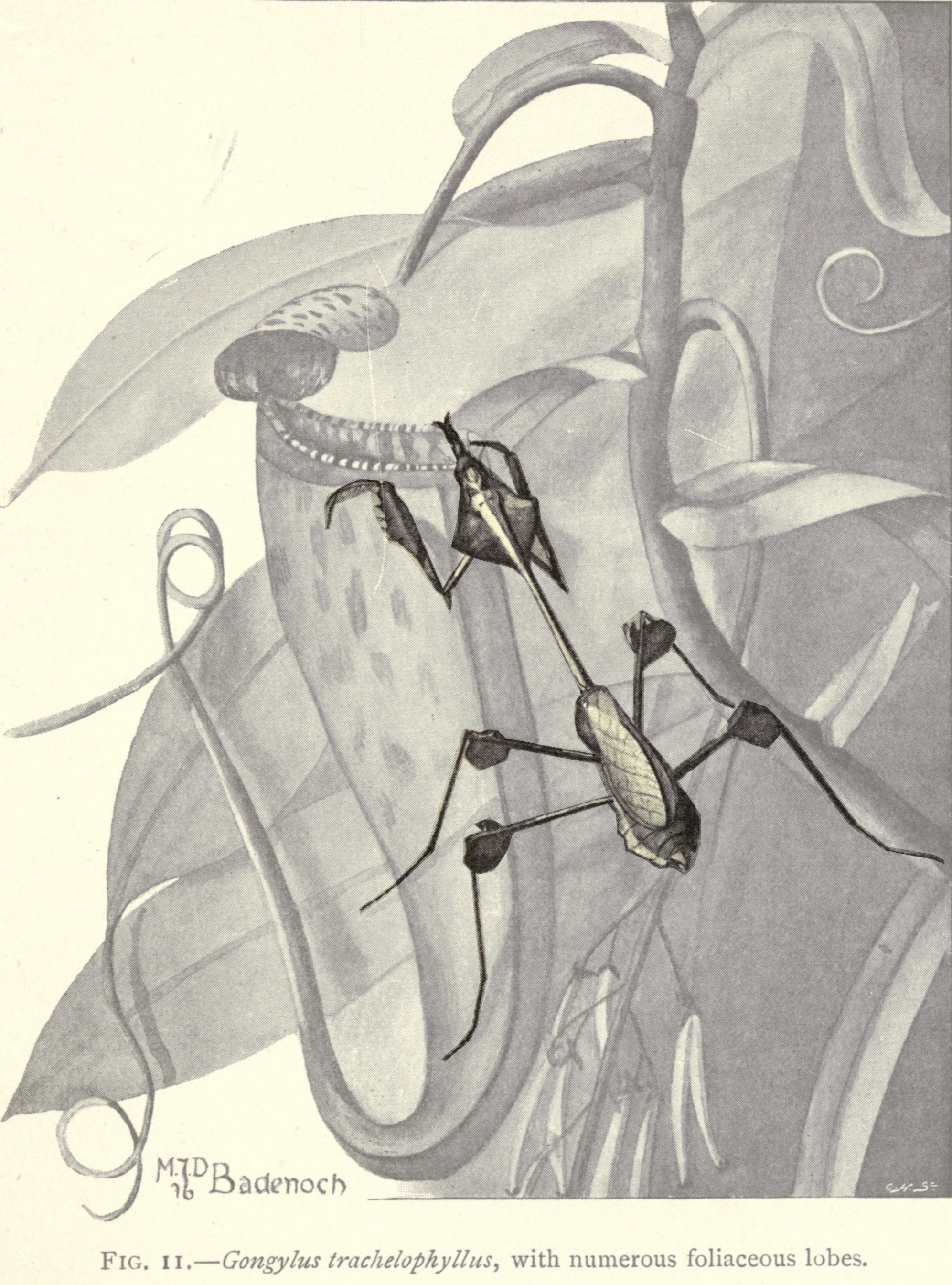

Scientific classification
- Kingdom: Animalia
- Phylum: Arthropoda
- Clade: Pancrustacea
- Class: Insecta
- Order: Mantodea
- Family: Empusidae
- Genus: Gongylus
- Species: G. trachelophyllus

Binomial name
- Gongylus trachelophyllus (Burmeister, 1838)

= Gongylus trachelophyllus =

Species of praying mantis

Gongylus trachelophyllus is a praying mantis in the family Empusidae which is characterized by extremely slender limbs with large appendages.

== Range ==
They are found in the Chota Nagpur Plateau region covering Bihar and Odisha states of India.

== Etymology ==
Its generic name Gongylus means "roundish" in Greek.
