= Blepharodes candelarius =

Scientific classification
- Domain: Eukaryota
- Kingdom: Animalia
- Phylum: Arthropoda
- Class: Insecta
- Order: Mantodea
- Family: Empusidae
- Genus: Blepharodes
- Species: B. candelarius

Binomial name
- Blepharodes candelarius Bolivar, 1890

Species of praying mantis

Blepharodes candelarius is a species of mantis in the genus Blepharodes in the order Mantodea.

== See also ==
- List of mantis genera and species
