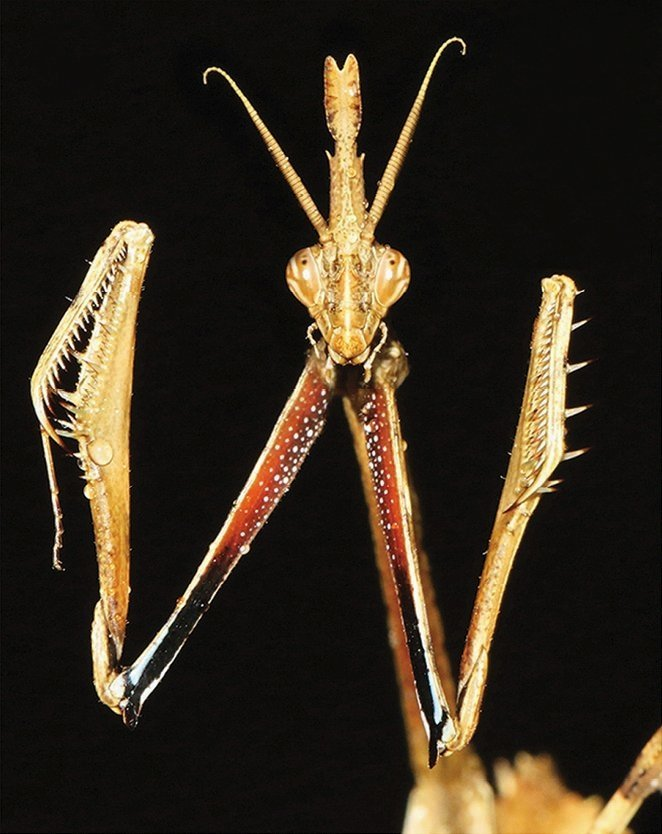
- Imago of Empusa hedenborgii, Iran

Scientific classification
- Kingdom: Animalia
- Phylum: Arthropoda
- Class: Insecta
- Order: Mantodea
- Family: Empusidae
- Genus: Empusa
- Species: E. hedenborgii

Binomial name
- Empusa hedenborgii Stal 1871

Synonyms
- Empusa hyalina Charpentier, 1835; Empusa pectinicornis Linne, 1767; Eremiaphila hedenborgii Stal 1871

= Empusa hedenborgii =

Species of praying mantis

Empusa hedenborgii is a species of praying mantis in the family Empusidae. It can be found in Spain, parts of Portugal, France, Lebanon, Central and Southern Italy and Greece.

== See also ==
- List of mantis genera and species
