= Empusa spinosa =

Scientific classification
- Kingdom: Animalia
- Phylum: Arthropoda
- Class: Insecta
- Order: Mantodea
- Family: Empusidae
- Genus: Empusa
- Species: E. spinosa

Binomial name
- Empusa spinosa Krauss, 1902

Synonyms
- Empusa fronticornis Stoll, 1813; Empusa nympha Stoll, 1813; Empusa purpuripennis Serville, 1839; Empusa wahlbergi Stal, 1856

Species of praying mantis

Empusa spinosa is a species of praying mantis in the family Empusidae.

== See also ==
- List of mantis genera and species
