= Blepharodes sudanensis =

Scientific classification
- Kingdom: Animalia
- Phylum: Arthropoda
- Clade: Pancrustacea
- Class: Insecta
- Order: Mantodea
- Family: Empusidae
- Genus: Blepharodes
- Species: B. sudanensis

Binomial name
- Blepharodes sudanensis Werner, 1907

Species of praying mantis

Blepharodes sudanensis, the Sudan blepharodes, is a species of mantis in the genus Blepharodes in the order Mantodea.

== See also ==
- List of mantis genera and species
