= Empusa romboidea =

Scientific classification
- Kingdom: Animalia
- Phylum: Arthropoda
- Class: Insecta
- Order: Mantodea
- Family: Empusidae
- Genus: Empusa
- Species: E. romboidea

Binomial name
- Empusa romboidea Lindt, 1976

Species of praying mantis

Empusa romboidea is a species of praying mantis in the family Empusidae.

== See also ==
- List of mantis genera and species
