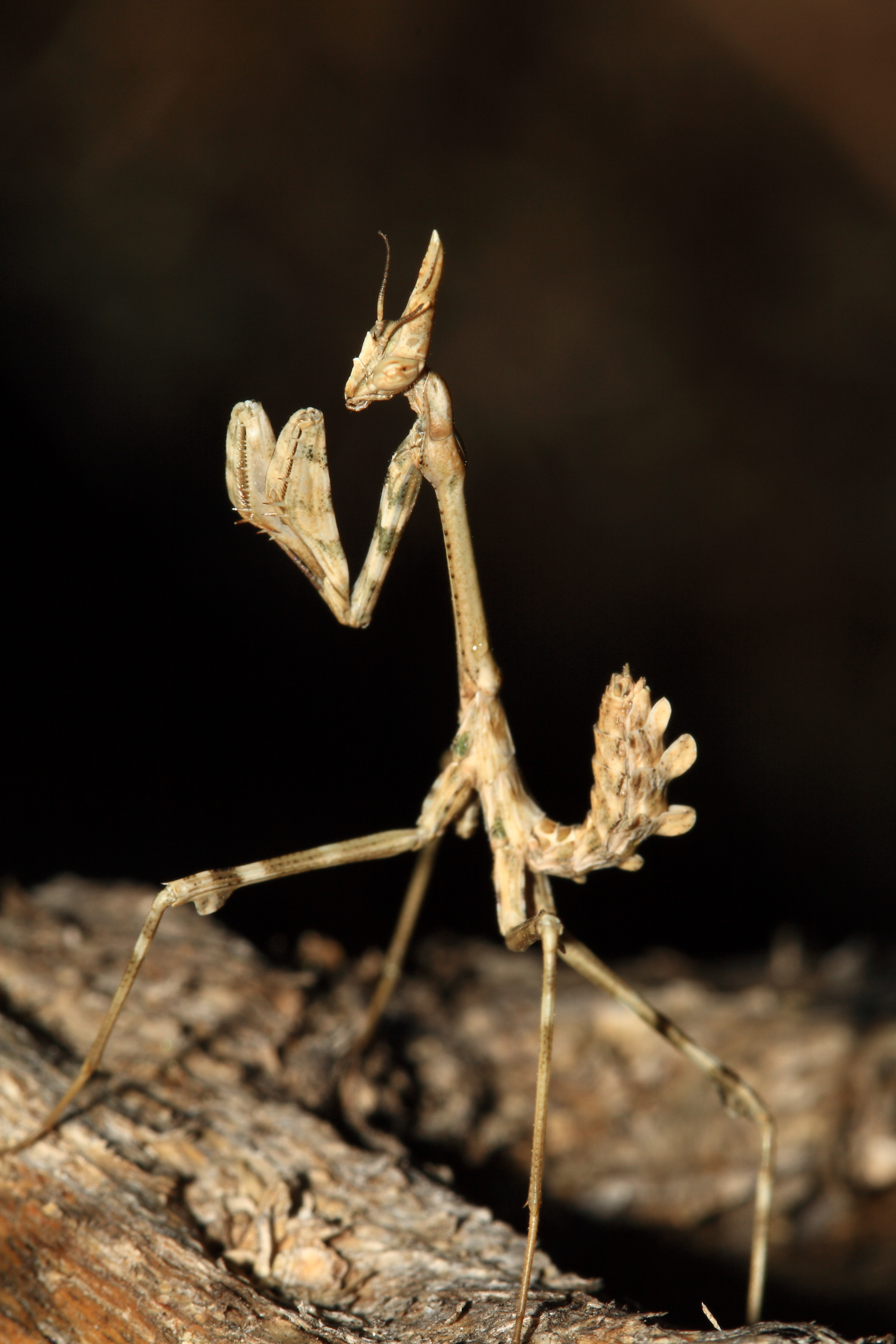
- Empusa pennata

Scientific classification
- Kingdom: Animalia
- Phylum: Arthropoda
- Clade: Pancrustacea
- Class: Insecta
- Order: Mantodea
- Family: Empusidae
- Subfamily: Empusinae
- Genus: Empusa; Illiger, 1798

Synonyms
- Ampusa Rambur, 1839; Phantoma Risso, 1826

= Empusa (mantis) =

Genus of praying mantises

Empusa is a genus of praying mantids in the family Empusidae and tribe Empusini. Records of occurrence include Africa, mainland Europe and western Asia through to India.

== Species ==
- E. binotata Serville, 1839
- E. fasciata Brulle, 1832
- E. guttula (Thunberg, 1815)
- E. hedenborgii Stål, 1871
- E. longicollis Ramme, 1950
- E. neglecta Paulian, 1958
- E. pauperata (Fabricius, 1781)
- E. pennata (Thunberg, 1815)
- E. pennicornis Pallas, 1773
- E. romboidea Lindt, 1976
- E. simonyi Krauss, 1902
- E. spinosa Krauss, 1902
- E. uvarovi Chopard, 1921
