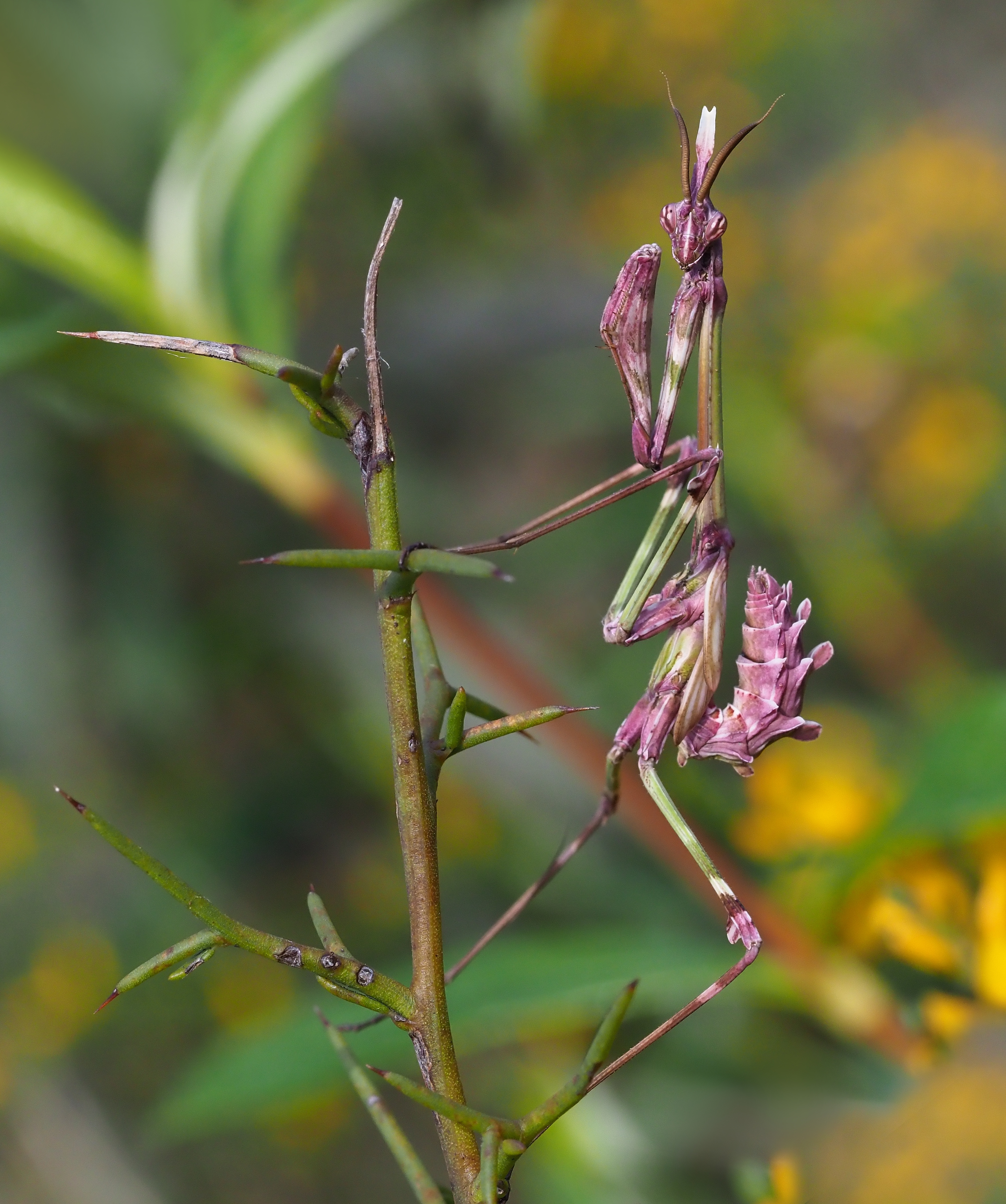

Conservation status
- Least Concern (IUCN 3.1)

Scientific classification
- Kingdom: Animalia
- Phylum: Arthropoda
- Clade: Pancrustacea
- Class: Insecta
- Order: Mantodea
- Family: Empusidae
- Genus: Empusa
- Species: E. pennata

Binomial name
- Empusa pennata (Thunberg, 1815)

Synonyms
- Empusa brachyptera Fischer-Waldheim, 1846; Empusa clavata Goeze, 1778; Empusa egena Charpentier, 1841; Empusa europaea Fieber, 1853; Empusa humbertiana Saussure, 1869; Empusa occidentalis Fieber, 1853; Empusa pauperata Fabricius, 1781; Empusa pectinata Drury, 1770; Empusa servillii Saussure, 1872; Empusa spuria Goeze, 1778; Empusa tricornis Goeze, 1778; Empusa unicornis Saussure, 1871; Empusa variabilis Risso, 1826

= Empusa pennata =

Species of praying mantis

Empusa pennata, or the conehead mantis, is a species of praying mantis in genus Empusa native to the Mediterranean Region. It can be found in Portugal, Spain, southern France, Italy and on the mediterranean coasts of Morocco, Algeria, Tunisia, Libya, Turkey and Egypt. Because of its cryptic nature, or also possibly because of its fragmented, low-density populations, it is rarely encountered in the wild.

== Overview ==
Empusa pennata generally has a large, thin body with a low mass, as well as a large pair of wings used for flight. They are mostly found in perennial herbs and scrubs. There are three ways for these insects to find mates: chemical, acoustic, and visual signals. Some predatory insects like mantises rely on cryptic colouration; they use this camouflage to protect themselves from predators and capture prey.

This species of mantis, although similar in size to the common European mantis (Mantis religiosa), is easily distinguished by the protrusion from its crown. Both males and females possess this tall extension from birth, giving them a very 'alien' appearance.

They live in dry, warm environments and use their cryptic colouring of either greens and pinks or various shades of brown to keep hidden from predators. Females may grow to a length of 10 cm, while males are shorter and slimmer. Males have distinctive ‘feather’-type antennae. Empusa pennata overwinters as a nymph and reaches the adult stage by spring. Its eggs develop quickly, especially in the summer months.

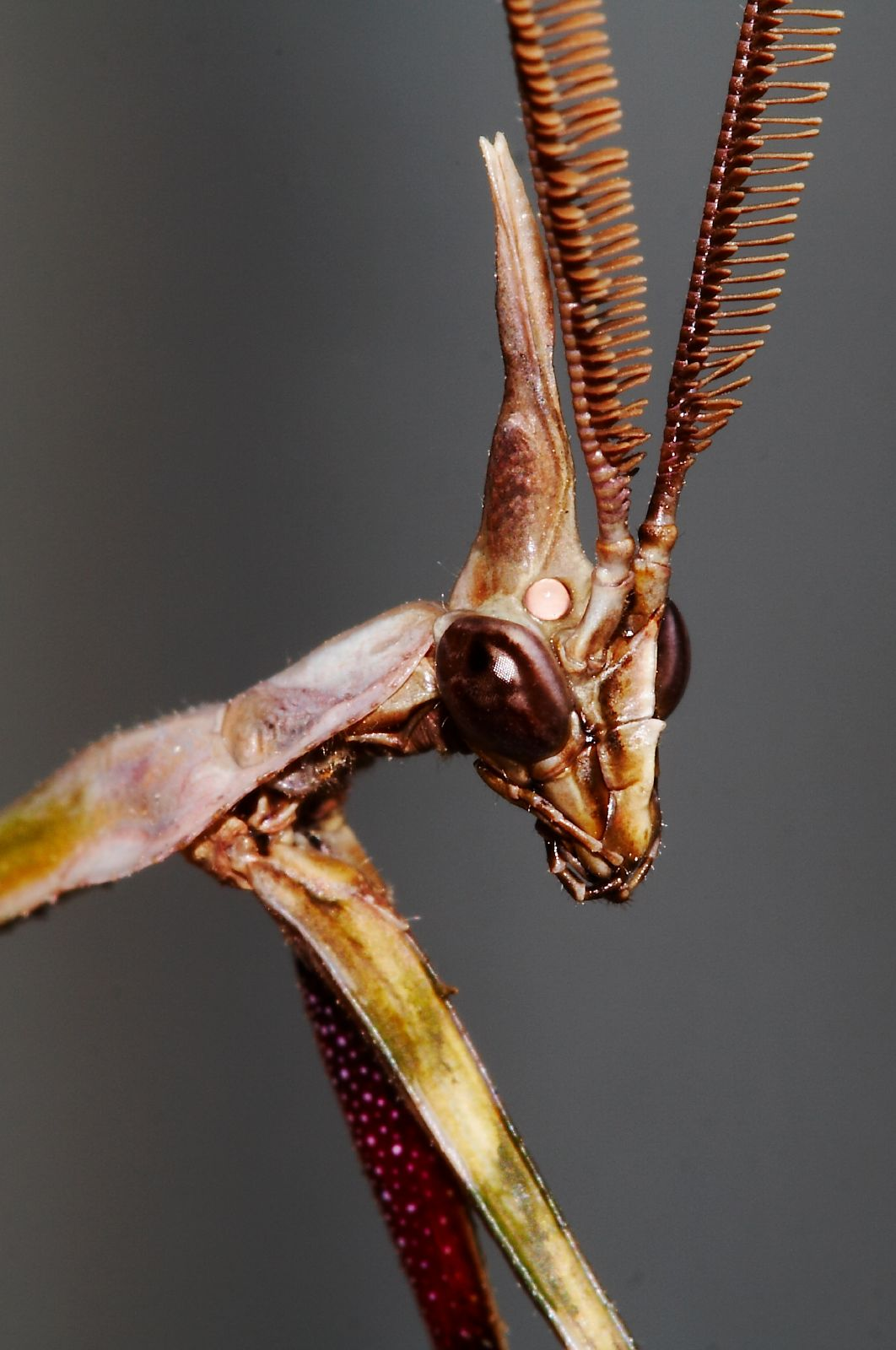
Adult - Male Head

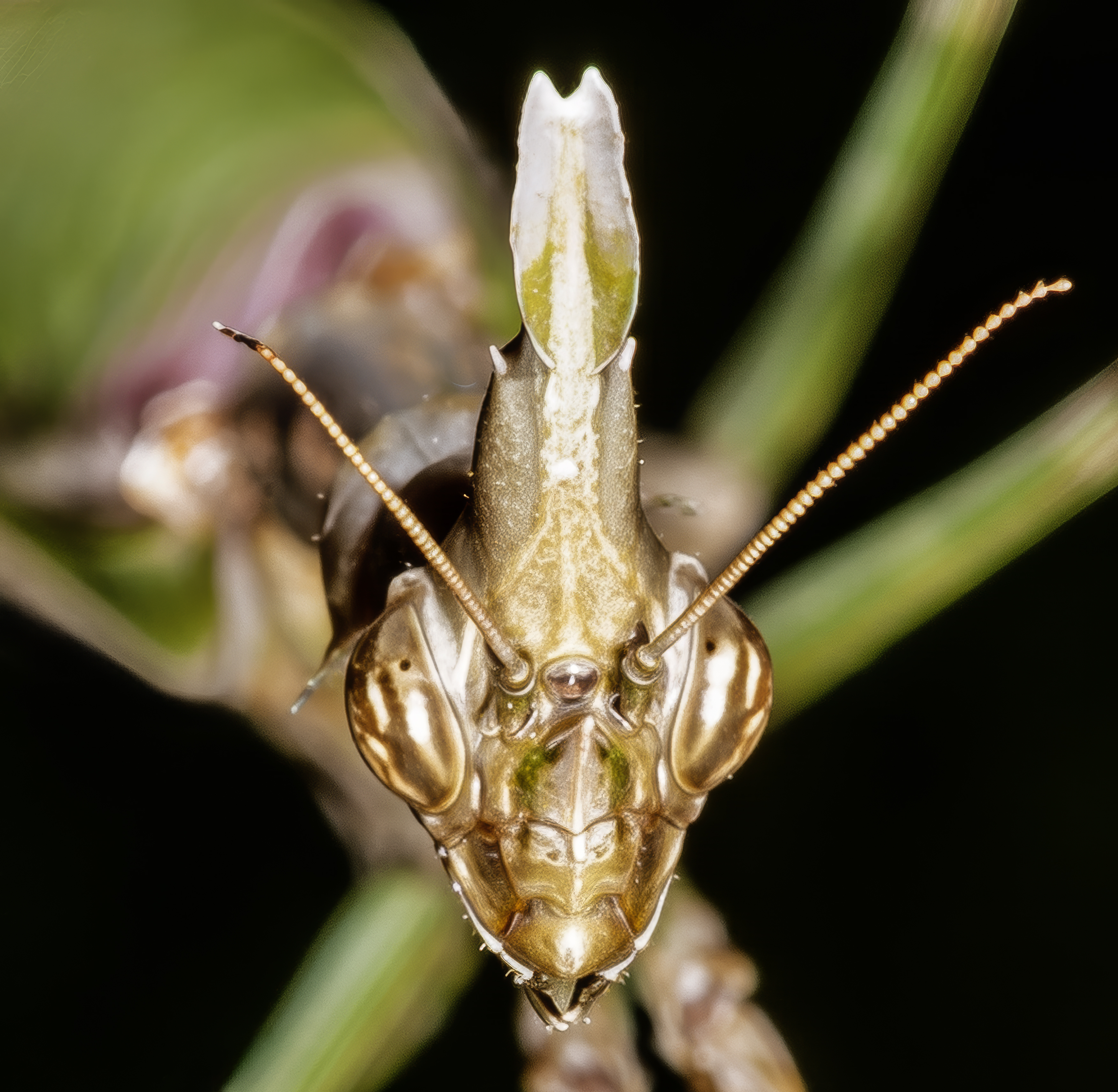
Adult - Female Head

== Nocturnal pheromone release ==
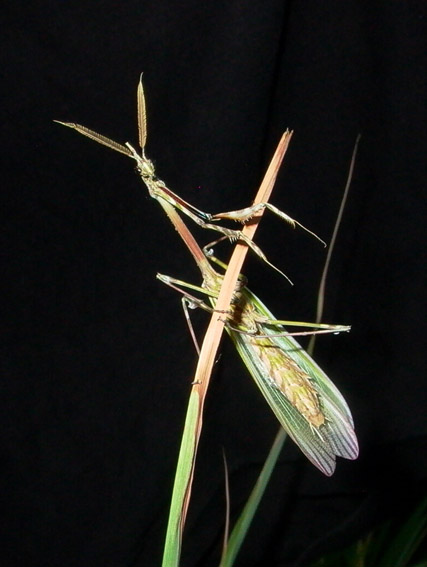
Empusa pennata

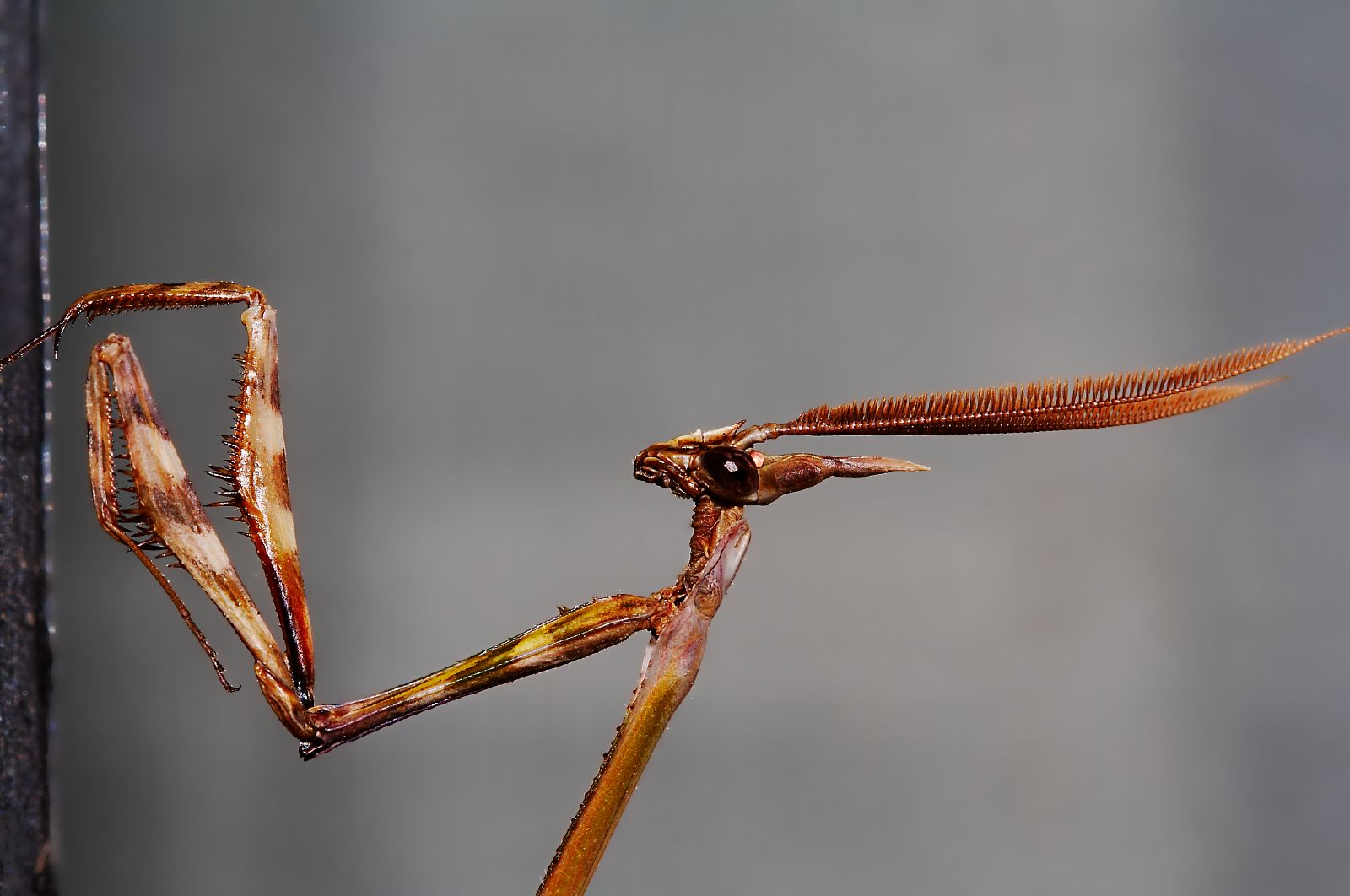
E. pennata side view

Insects that depend on vision may be hindered in finding mates at night because they cannot see each other. Therefore, conehead mantises emit a sex pheromone when searching for mates nocturnally. The release of a sex pheromone by Empusa pennata is an adaptation derived from sexual selection.

== Feeding ecology ==
Mantises stalk their prey and pounce on it, grasping it with their raptorial forelegs. Only living prey is selected and it is consumed directly after the catch. The predator orients itself optically, and therefore only takes notice of moving prey. The maximum size of prey which mantises can overwhelm is species-specific and depends on the prey type. On average mantises eat crickets of 50% their own body weight, while cockroaches can weigh up to 110%.
