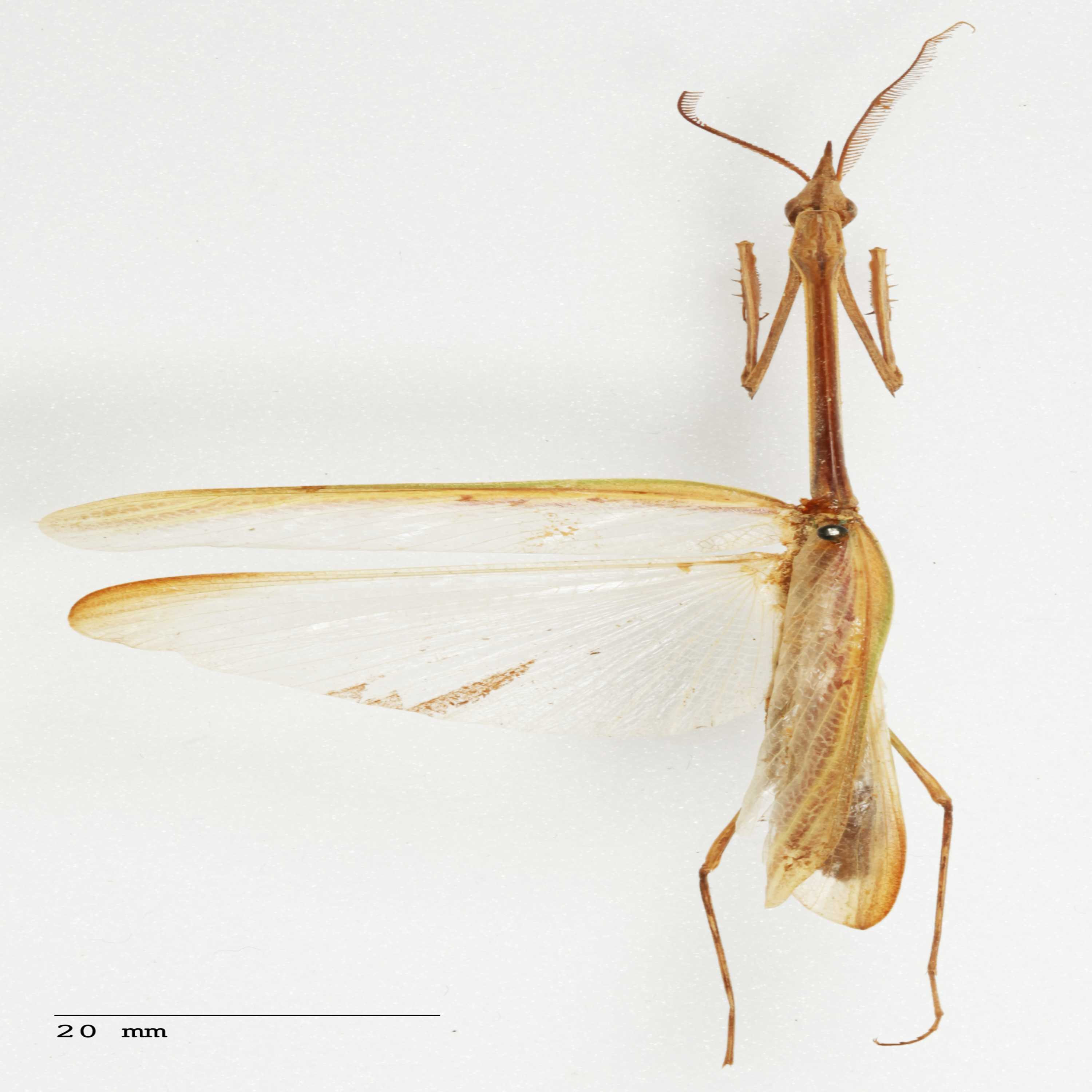
- Idolomorpha lateralis

Scientific classification
- Kingdom: Animalia
- Phylum: Arthropoda
- Clade: Pancrustacea
- Class: Insecta
- Order: Mantodea
- Family: Empusidae
- Genus: Idolomorpha; Burmeister, 1838

Species
- Idolomorpha dentifrons; Idolomorpha lateralis; Idolomorpha madagascariensis; Idolomorpha sagitta

= Idolomorpha =

Genus of praying mantises

Idolomorpha is a genus of mantises in the family Empusidae.

== See also ==
- List of mantis genera and species
