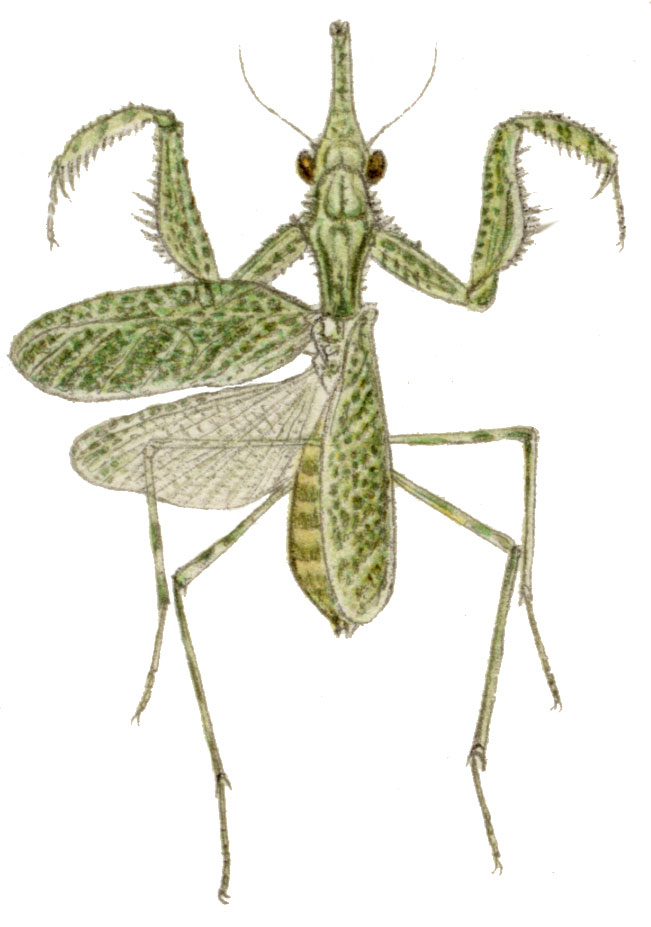
- Blepharodes cornutus, female

Scientific classification
- Kingdom: Animalia
- Phylum: Arthropoda
- Clade: Pancrustacea
- Class: Insecta
- Order: Mantodea
- Family: Empusidae
- Subfamily: Blepharodinae
- Genus: Blepharodes; Bolivar, 1890

Synonyms
- Phlaebarodes Giglio-Tos, 1917

= Blepharodes =

Genus of praying mantises

Blepharodes is a genus of North African mantis in the family Empusidae.

== Species ==
The Mantodea Species File currently includes:

1. Blepharodes candelarius Bolivar 1890
2. Blepharodes cornutus Schulthess 1894
3. Blepharodes parumspinosus Beier 1930
4. Blepharodes sudanensis Werner 1907

== See also ==
- List of mantis genera and species
