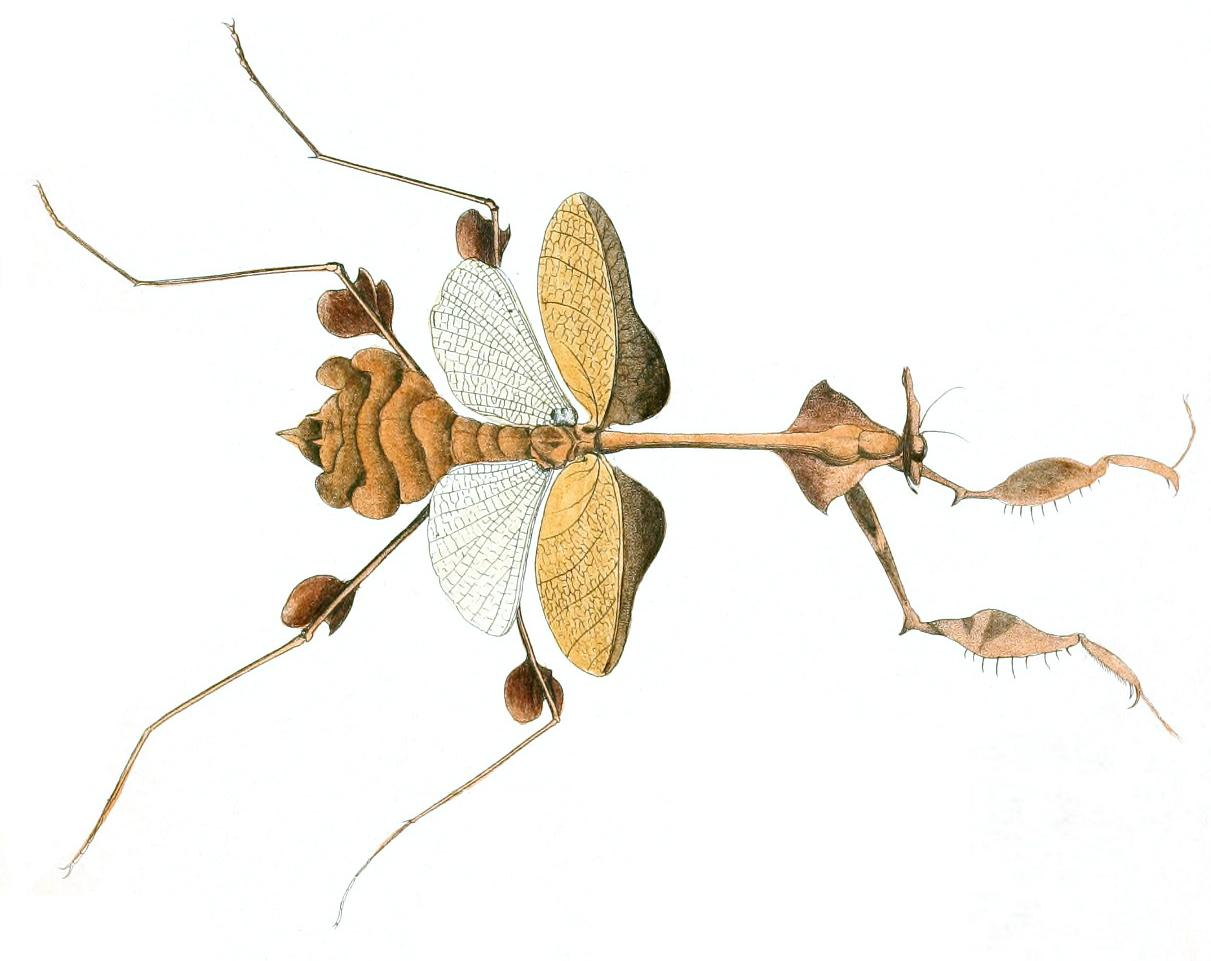
- Gongylus gongylodes

Scientific classification
- Kingdom: Animalia
- Phylum: Arthropoda
- Clade: Pancrustacea
- Class: Insecta
- Order: Mantodea
- Family: Empusidae
- Genus: Gongylus
- Species: G. gongylodes

Binomial name
- Gongylus gongylodes (Linnaeus, 1758)

Synonyms
- Gryllus gongylodes Linnaeus, 1758; Gongylus flabellicornis Fabricius, 1793

= Gongylus gongylodes =

Species of praying mantis

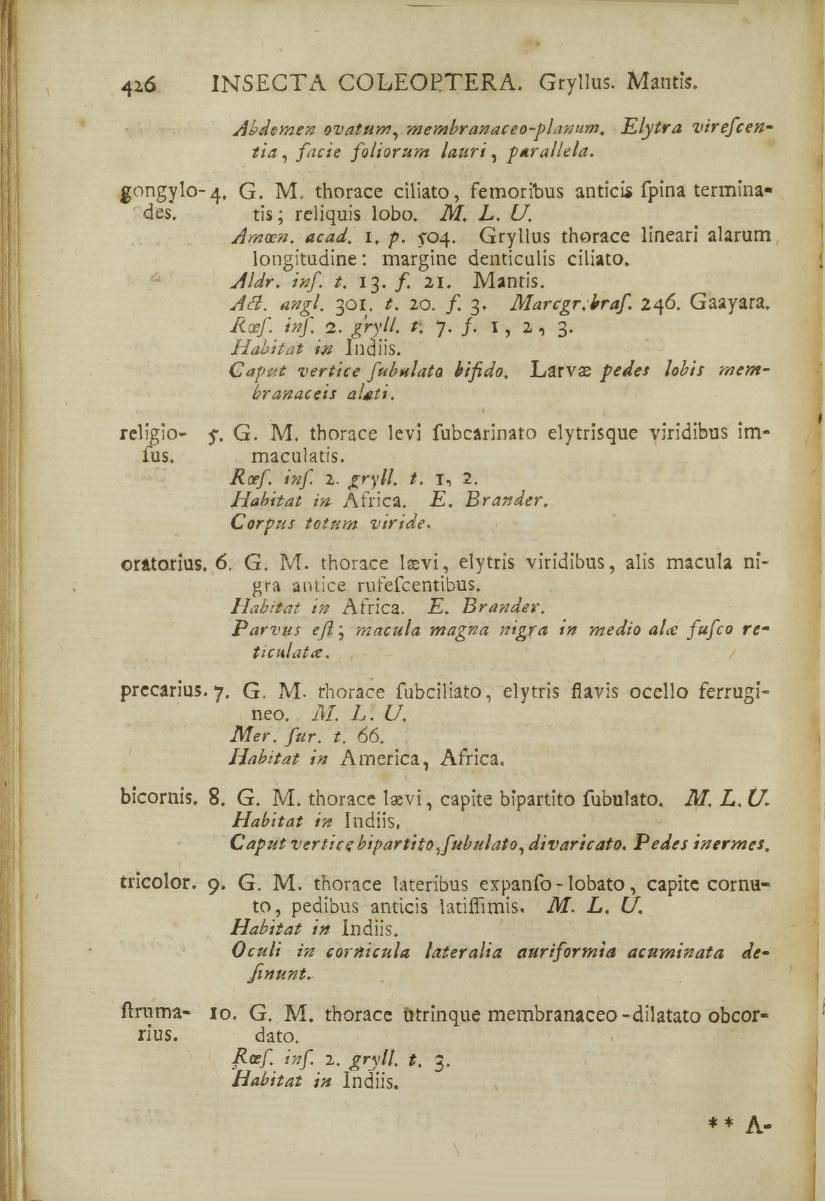
Copy of the original description of several species of mantis including Gongylus gongylodes, described by Carl Linnaeus as Gryllus (Mantis) gongylodes in 1758.

Gongylus gongylodes, also known as the wandering violin mantis, ornate mantis, or Indian rose mantis, is a species of praying mantis in the family Empusidae. Characterized by extremely slender limbs with large appendages, it is not a particularly aggressive species and often kept as a pet. The mantis is especially known for swaying its body back and forth to imitate a stick flowing in the wind. It primarily feeds on flying insects. Its native range is in southern India and Sri Lanka. It can reach up to 11 cm (4.3 in) long. The males of the species are capable of flight. They are a communal species, in that they are able to live and breed in large groups, without unnecessary cannibalism. Adult females are about 10cm (3 in) and adult males are about 9 cm.

Its specific name gongylodes means "roundish" in Greek, from the same word as its generic epithet Gongylus.

== Range ==
They are found in India, Java, Myanmar, Sri Lanka, and Thailand.

== Gallery ==
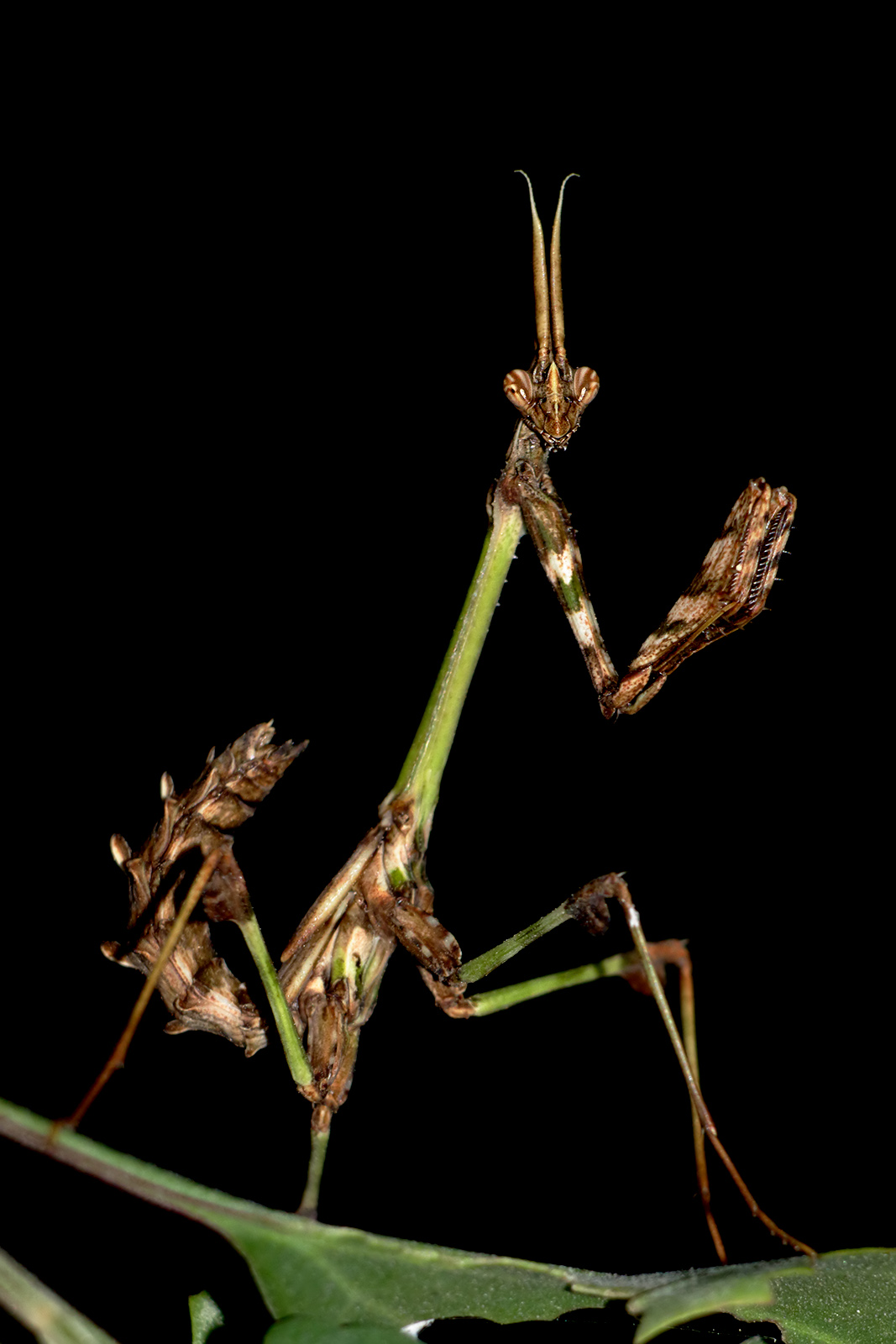
G. gongylodes

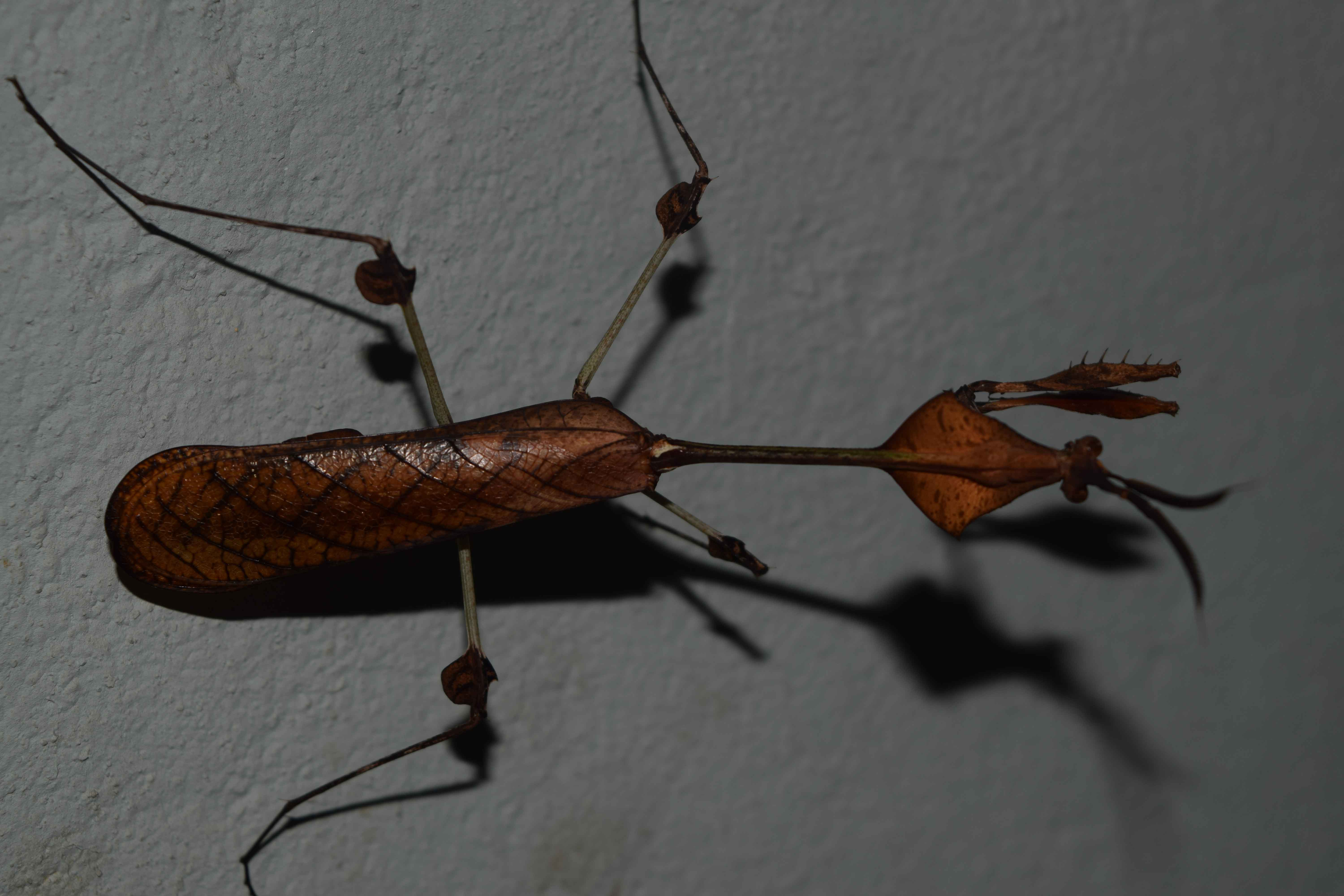
G. gongylodes

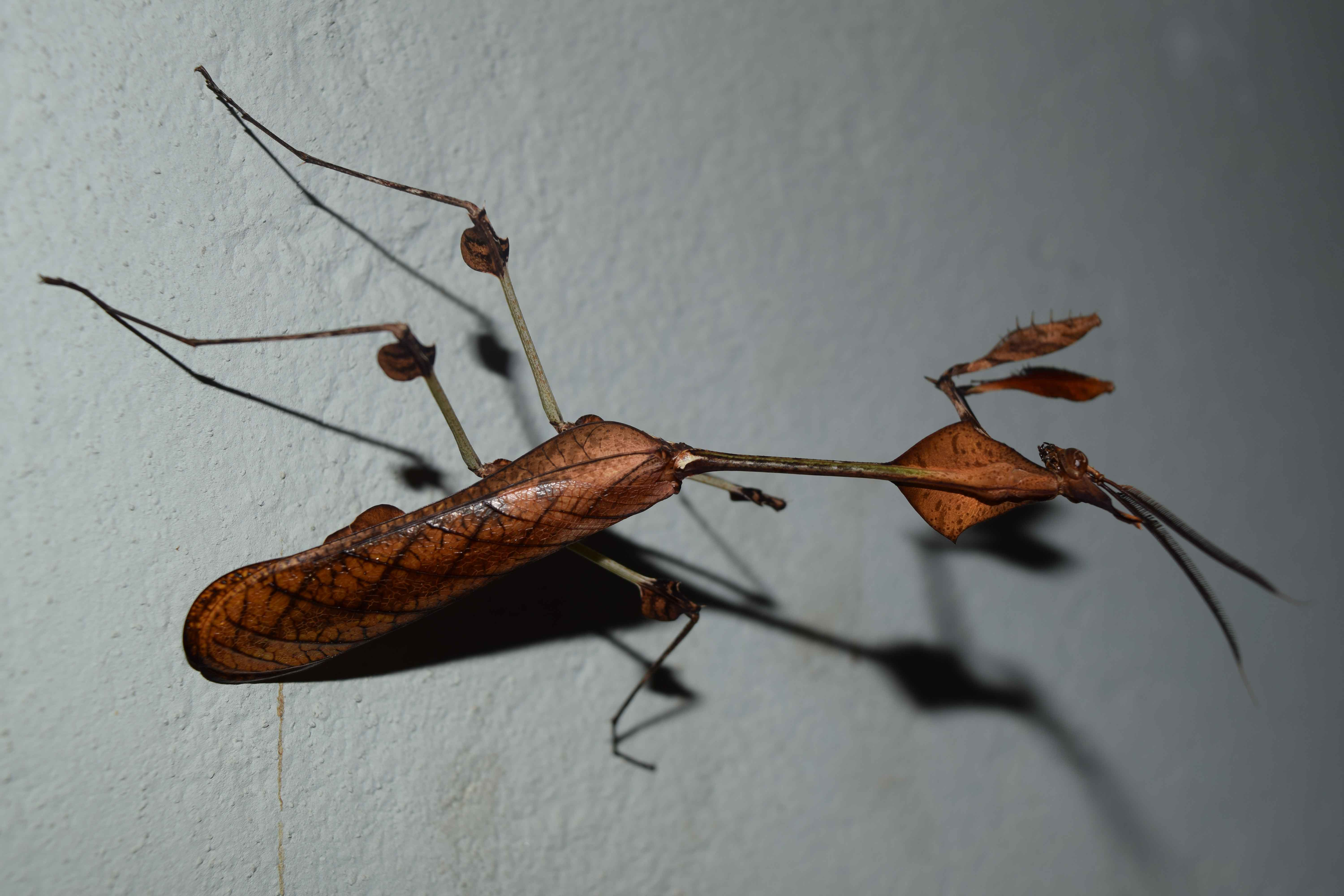
G. gongylodes

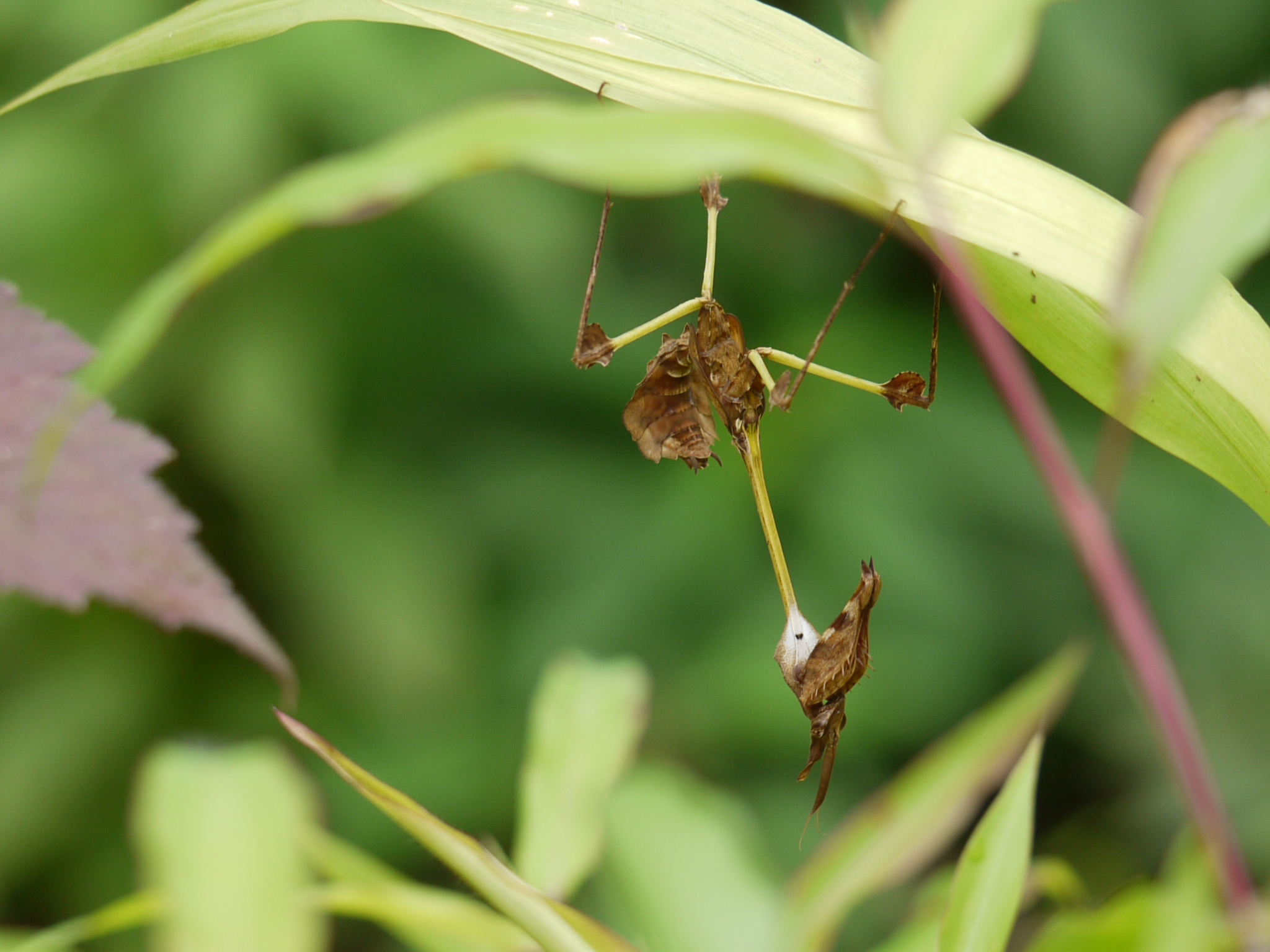
G. gongylodes

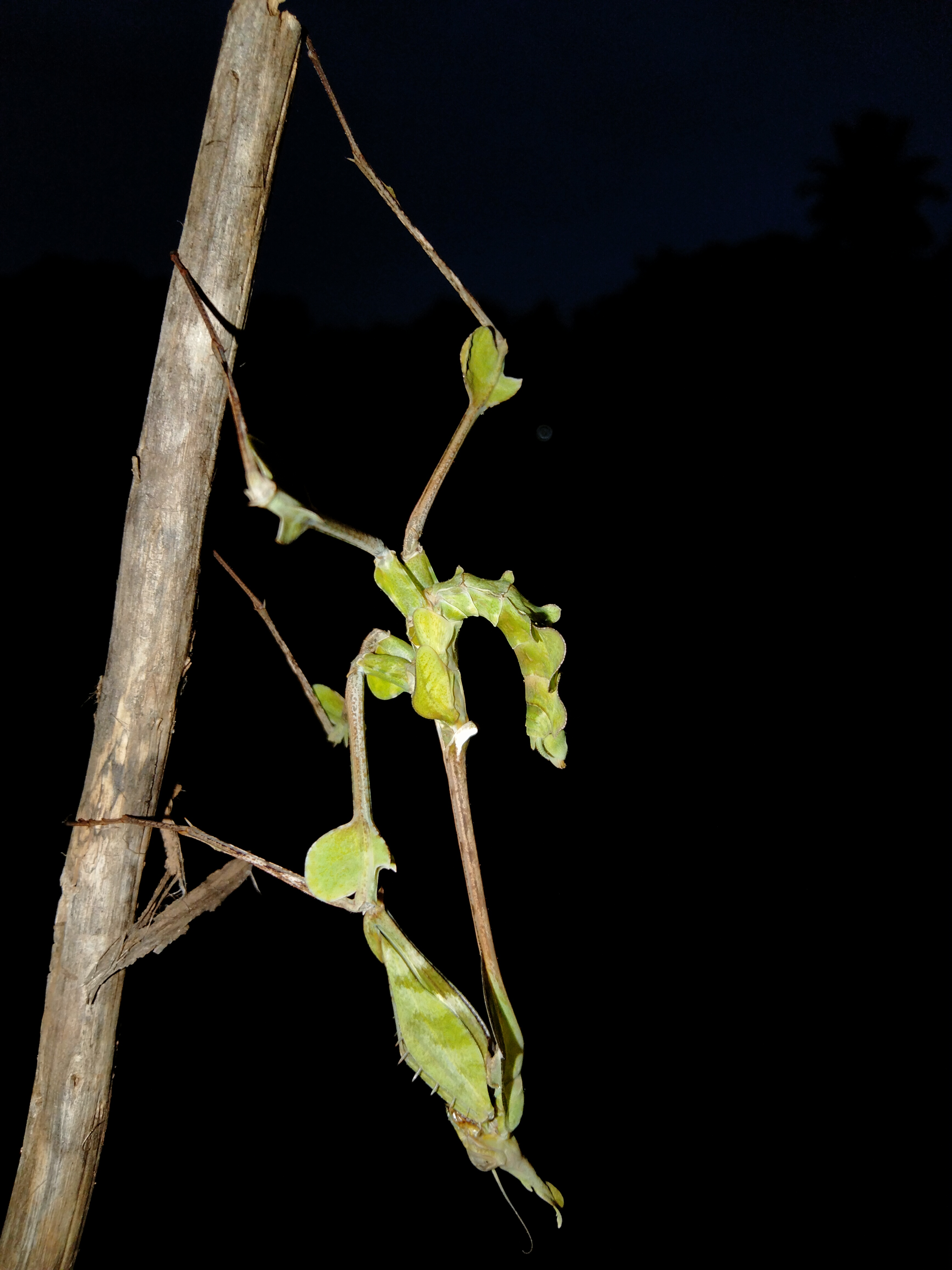
Violin mantis at Madikai Ambalathukara, Kerala, India

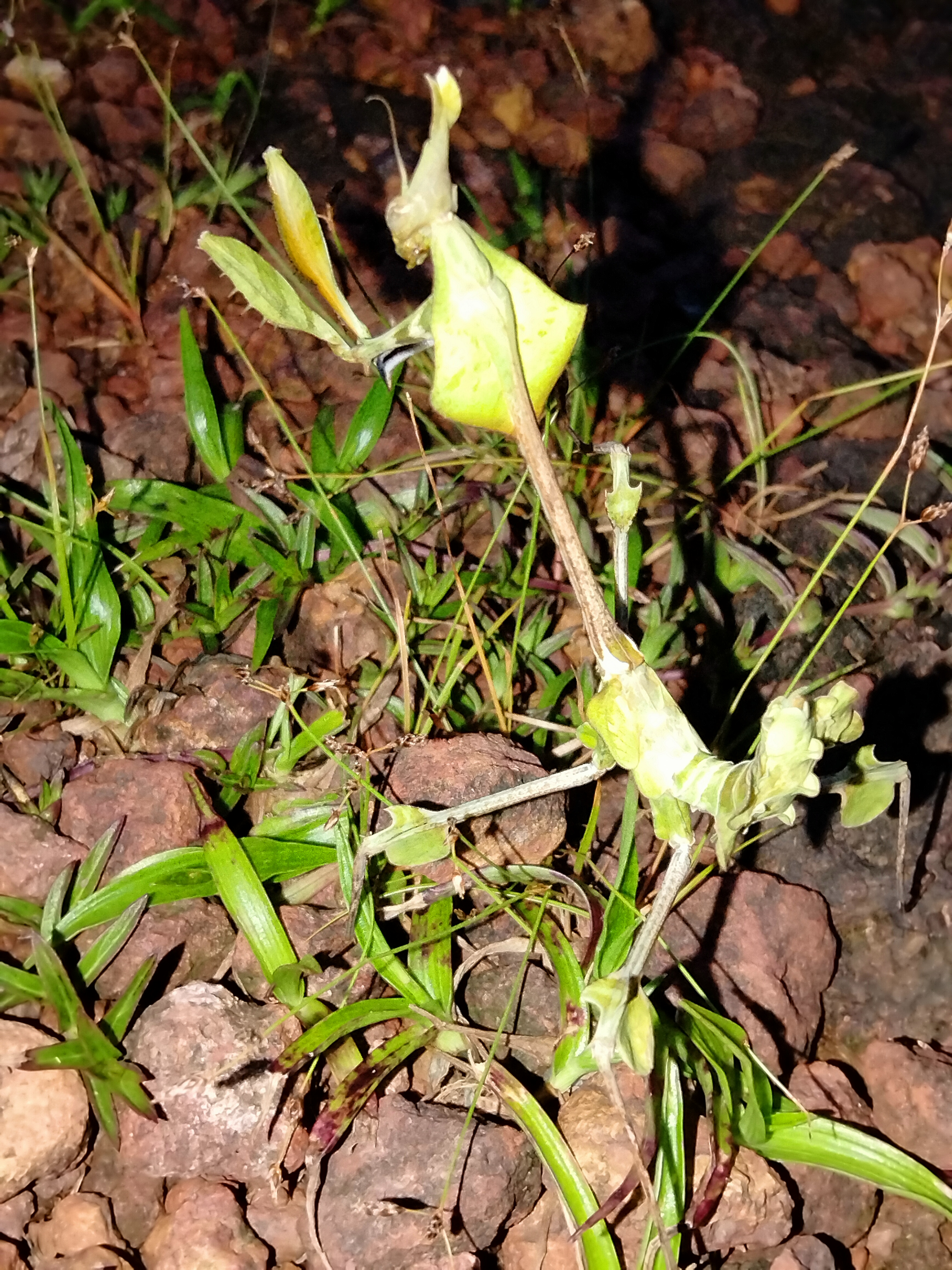
Violin mantis
