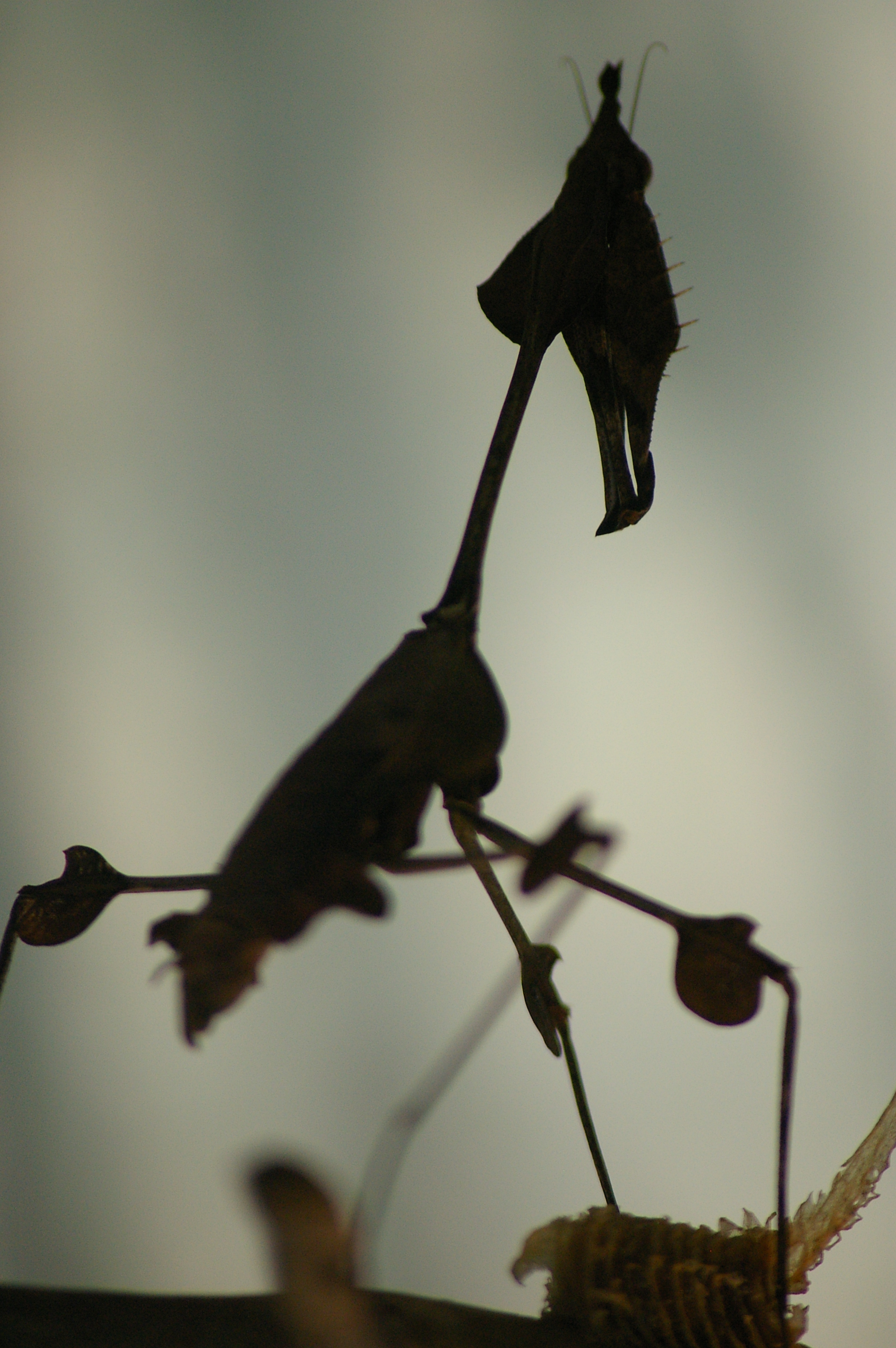

Scientific classification
- Kingdom: Animalia
- Phylum: Arthropoda
- Clade: Pancrustacea
- Class: Insecta
- Order: Mantodea
- Family: Empusidae
- Subfamily: Empusinae
- Genus: Gongylus; Thunberg, 1815

Species
- Gongylus gongylodes; Gongylus pauperatus; Gongylus trachelophyllus

= Gongylus =

Genus of praying mantises

Gongylus is a genus of praying mantises in the family Empusidae. Characterized by extremely slender limbs with large appendages, at least one species (Gongylus gongylodes) is kept as a pet by hobbyists. Males of the species are capable of flight.

The Greek word gongýlos (γογγύλος) means 'round'.

== See also ==
- List of mantis genera and species
