= Idolomantis =

Devil's flower mantis
- Adult male (dorsal view)

Scientific classification
- Kingdom: Animalia
- Phylum: Arthropoda
- Clade: Pancrustacea
- Class: Insecta
- Order: Mantodea
- Family: Empusidae
- Genus: Idolomantis; Uvarov, 1940 (replacement name for Idolum Saussure, 1869 nec Idolum Pfeiffer, 1856)
- Species: I. diabolica

Binomial name
- Idolomantis diabolica (Saussure, 1869)

Synonyms
- (Genus): Idolum Saussure, 1869; (Species): Idolum diabolica (Saussure, 1869); Idolum diabolicum (Saussure, 1869); Idolum diabroticum (Shelford, 1903); Idolomantis diabroticum (Shelford, 1903)

Genus of praying mantises

Idolomantis is a monotypic genus of mantises in the family Empusidae. It contains the single species, Idolomantis diabolica, commonly known as the devil's flower mantis or giant devil's flower mantis. It is one of the largest species of mantises, and is possibly the largest that mimics flowers.

== Description ==
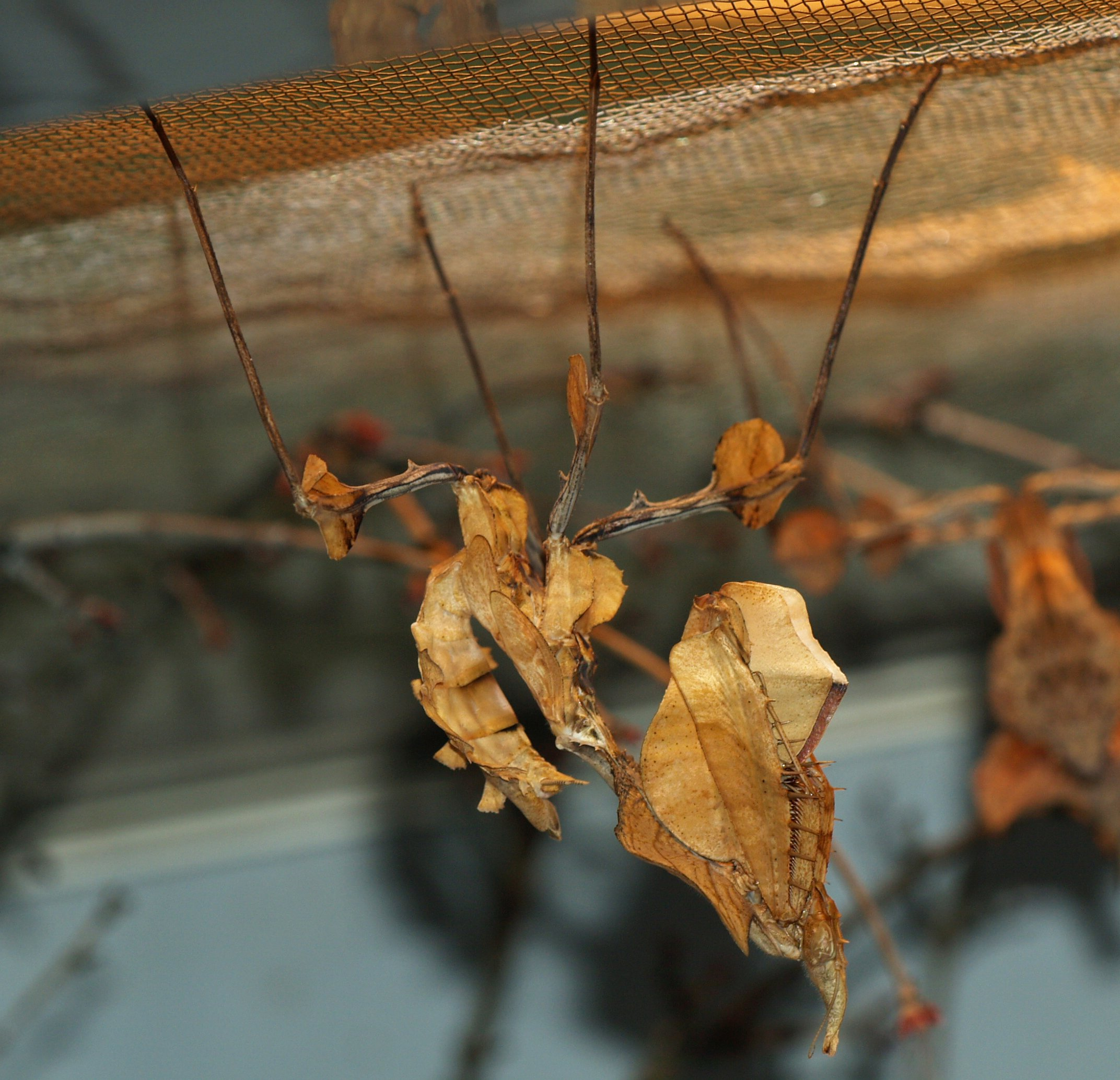
Idolomantis diabolica, subadult

Idolomantis diabolica is a large mantis of the family Empusidae. Females grow to be about 13 cm (5.1 in) in length and males to about 10 cm (3.9 in). It is native to Ethiopia, Kenya, Malawi, Somalia, Tanzania, South Sudan, and Uganda. Its threat display is magnificently colored, with red, white, blue, purple, and black.

== Anatomy ==
The basic anatomical structure of I. diabolica is similar to most species of the order Mantodea, but the morphology of each species varies according to its native habitat, and this species is modified somewhat to enhance its floral mimicry.

=== Head ===
The head of I. diabolica contains three vital components: compound eyes, antennae, and mandibles. The compound eyes, composed of thousands of individual photoreceptor cells, enable good eyesight. The arrangement of photoreceptor units, for instance, allows the insect to capture a perceptual span of 180°. This allows I. diabolica to identify prey and predators without increasing its vulnerability by spoiling its camouflage. The antennae, a pair of long and thin bristles, serve as the insect's sensory perception. Projecting outwards, the antennae can detect much in the surrounding environment such as chemicals, movement, and odors. The male antennae are more developed than those of the females and are feather-like. This allows them to track down females by detecting the pheromones released by the females. These pheromones notify the males that the females are ready to reproduce. The mandibles can be used to "tear, puncture, or grind" food.

=== Thorax ===
The thorax constitutes a large portion of the insect's body. As in all insects, it is composed of three segments: the prothorax, mesothorax, and metathorax. Each section "contains one pair of legs, however, the wings are found only on the mesothoracic and metathoracic segments."

=== Abdomen ===
Reproductive organs, respiratory organs, and other organ systems occupy the abdominal region of the insect.

== Behaviour ==
=== Defensive behaviour ===
When confronted by a predator, I. diabolica initiates a deimatic display in an attempt "to scare off or momentarily distract a predator". Its front legs, specifically the femora, are raised to expose the conspicuous patterns depicted on the bottom of the thorax and abdomen. Similarly, the wings display a combination of vibrant colours. Observational analysis of I. diabolica in captive settings revealed an additional tactic of shifting its wings left to right to startle and confuse predators.

=== Predatory behaviour ===
In the presence of prey, I. diabolica, impersonating a flower, remains motionless. Its objective is to seduce the insect into its striking zone. In this zone, Idolomantis diabolica uses the tibiae of its legs to grasp and maintain a strong grip on the prey. The mandibles are then "wielded as formidable weapons" to decapitate and devour the prey. The dietary preference of I. diabolica is exclusively airborne insects, specifically flies, moths, butterflies and beetles.

== Reproduction ==
=== Copulation ===
Before reproducing, mature females display dimorphic features in an attempt to attract males. Females lower the tips of their abdomens and raise their wings slightly to expose more of the uppermost side of the abdomen, thus releasing pheromone to attract a mate. However, sexual cannibalism is prominent among pairs of I. diabolica that remain in captivity. Due to their precautious nature, intrusive environments lead to aggressive behaviour. For example, a female, in the process of copulating, adopts predatorial instincts, which often conclude with the female devouring the head of the male.

=== Nymphs ===
A female deposits some 10 to 50 eggs in an ootheca. The period between egg-laying and hatching varies according to temperature and humidity, but about fifty days would be typical. After hatching, the nymphs feed on small insects such as houseflies and fruit flies. Males develop into adults after undergoing ecdysis about seven times into successive instars, while females mature after about eight instars. The lifespan of I. diabolica varies according to the habitat, but is typically about 12 months.

== Pet industry ==
Due to its beauty and dramatic displays, I. diabolica is considered a prestigious pet. Consumers, specifically in the Western Hemisphere, purchase thousands on a yearly basis.

== See also ==
- List of mantis genera and species
- Flower mantis
- Blepharopsis mendica
