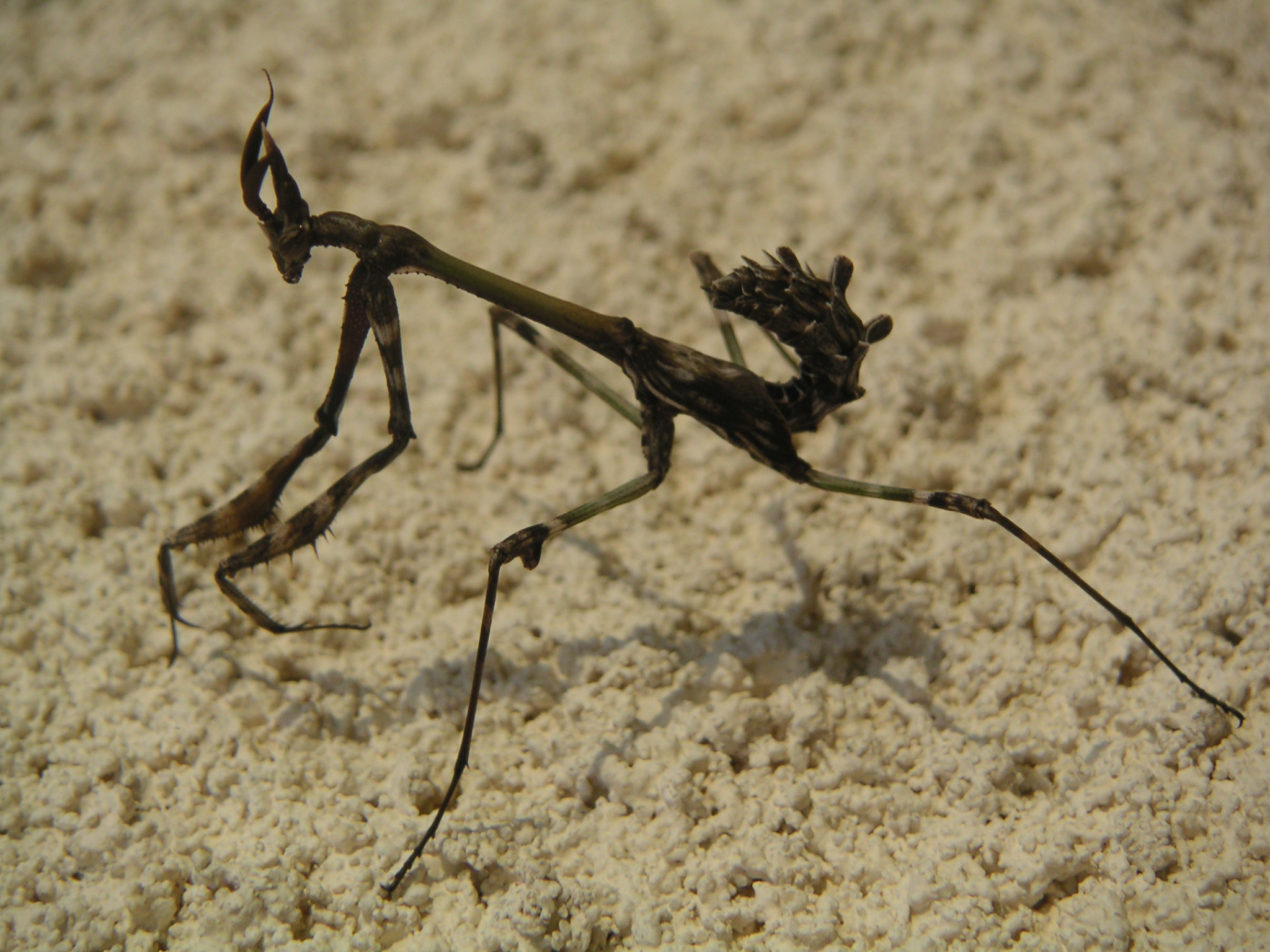
- Empusa pennata

Scientific classification
- Kingdom: Animalia
- Phylum: Arthropoda
- Clade: Pancrustacea
- Class: Insecta
- Order: Mantodea
- Family: Empusidae; Burmeister, 1838

= Empusidae =

Family of praying mantises

Empusidae is a family of plant-mimicking mantises, consisting of 10 genera, in two subfamilies. Unlike many other mantis families, the Empusidae are a monophyletic lineage. Empusidae mantises are ambush predators, with mouthparts adapted to feeding on other insects and small animals. The majority of Empusidae species are distributed throughout Africa, but they are also found in Southeast Asia and in the southern parts of Europe.

== Natural history ==
The Empusidae species Gongylus gongylodes (Linné, 1758) was the first mantis species ever to be described. Since Gongylus mantises have been fascinating entomologists and have been bred in captivity for a long time, their behavior and breeding preferences are well known, such as a defensive behavior of displaying a hissing noise by rubbing the anterior edges of its serrated fore wings to the femur of the hind legs.

== Morphology ==
The about 28 species of empusid mantis are all relatively large and bizarre looking. The prothorax is always surrounded by a crest and the femur of the middle and hind legs often have flap-like appendages. The pronotum is characteristically elongated and the abdomen is often lobed. Members of the Mantoidea superfamily possess a cyclopean ear, an organ situated on the metathorax, which has been proven to be an adaptation to bat predation. The presence of this adaptation has been dated to originate in the early Eocene.

== Phylogeny ==
The Empusidae belong to the superfamily Hymenopoidea, together with the Hymenopodidae. Phylogenetic studies place the Empusidae as a sister group to the Hymenopodidae. The Empusidae and Hymenopodidae are, in turn, placed as sister groups to all other ambush mantises.

The latest phylogeny was revised by Svenson et al. 2015. The Mantodea Species File currently includes two subfamilies:

=== Blepharodinae ===
- Blepharodes Bolivar, 1890
- Blepharopsis Rehn, 1902

=== Empusinae ===
This subfamily is divided into two tribes:

==== Empusini ====
subtribe Empusina

- Dilatempusa Roy, 2004
- Empusa Illiger, 1798
- Gongylus Thunberg, 1815
- Hypsicorypha Krauss, 1892

subtribe Idolomorphina

- Chopardempusa Paulian, 1958
- Hemiempusa Saussure & Zehntner, 1895
- Idolomorpha Burmeister, 1838

==== Idolomorphini ====
- Idolomantis Uvarov, 1940

== Historical findings ==
In 2017-2018, a rock carving of an Empusidae with raptorial forearms was revealed in the Teimareh rock art site in the Khomeyn County, Iran. An engraved, insect-like image has a 14-cm length and 11-cm width with two circles at its sides which probably dates 40,000–4,000 years back. This motif is analogous to the famous 'squatter man' petroglyph encountered at several locations around the world.

== Gallery ==
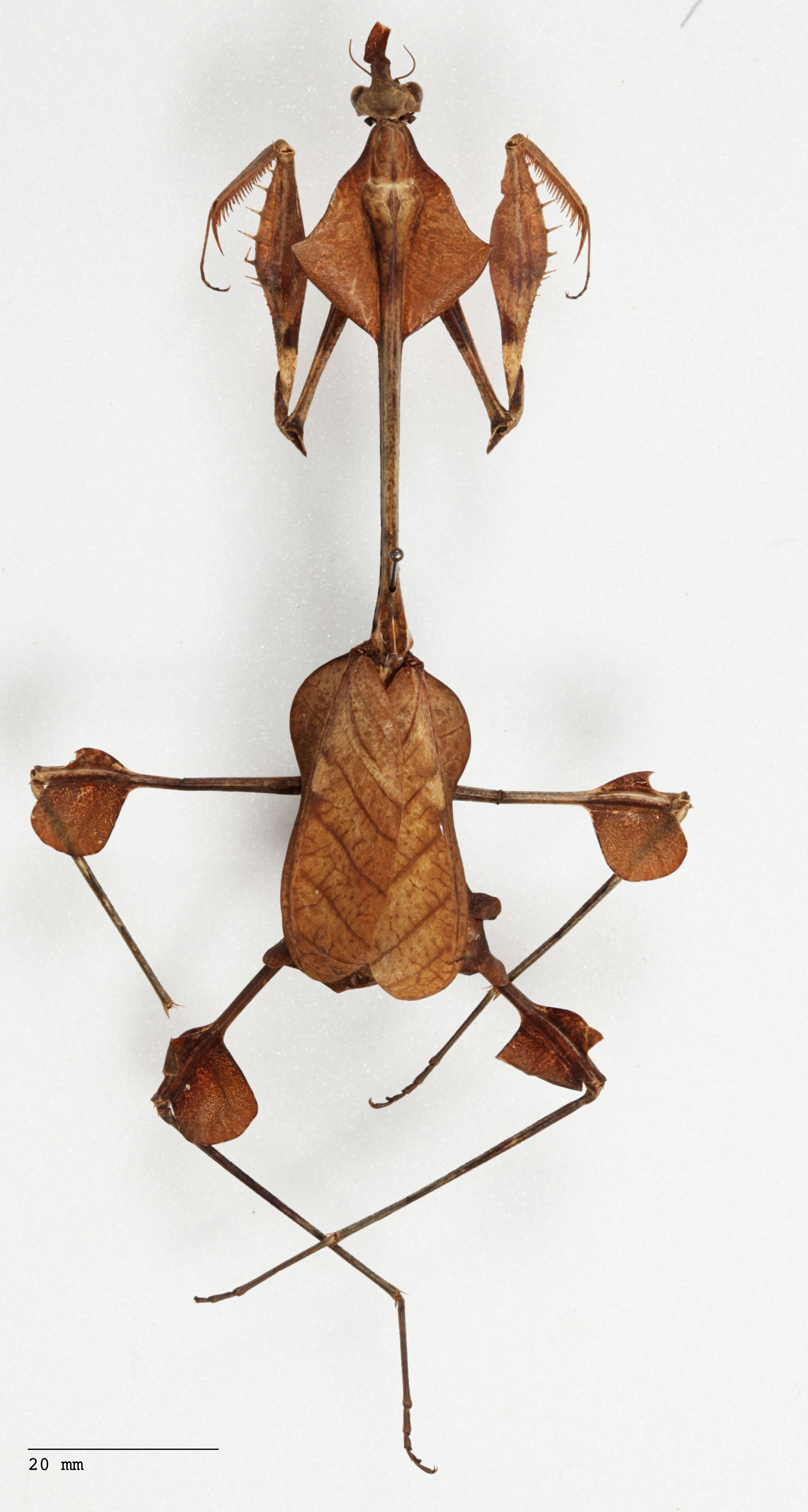
Gongylus gongylodes

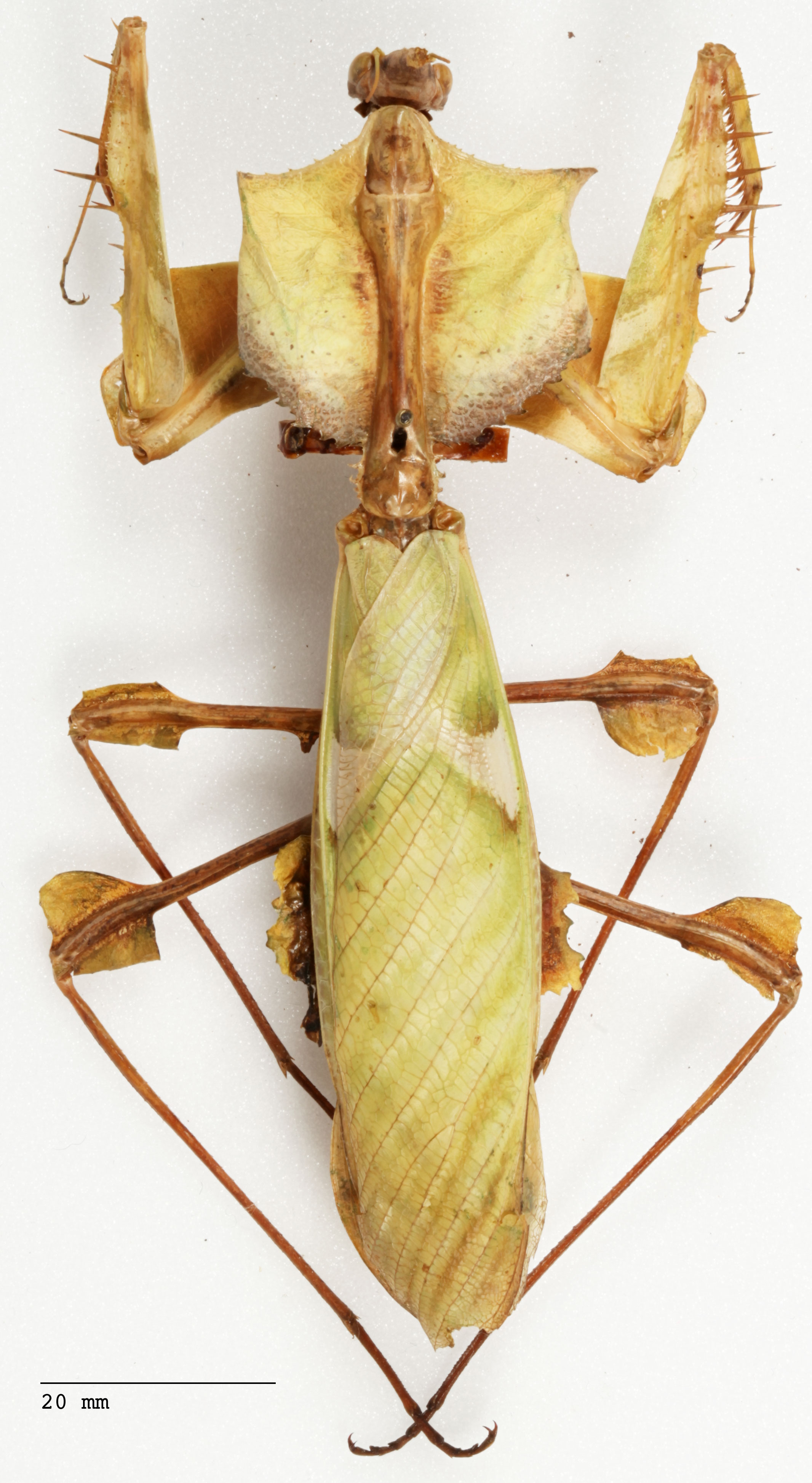
I. diabolica

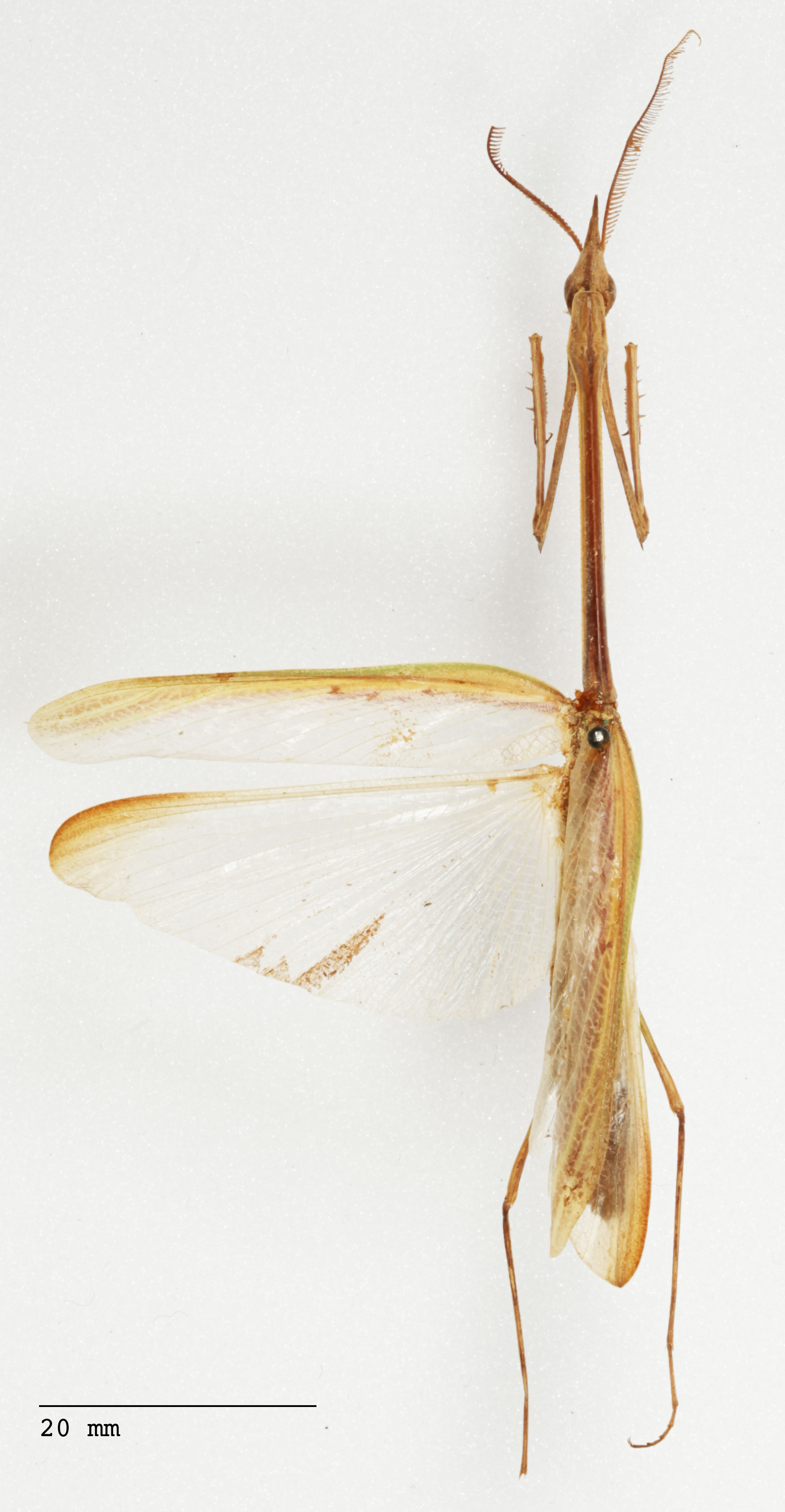
I. lateralis

== See also ==
- List of mantis genera and species
