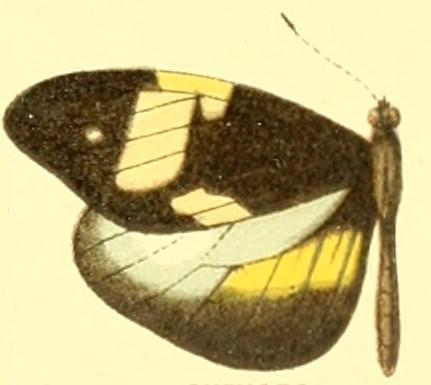
- D. e. eunoe
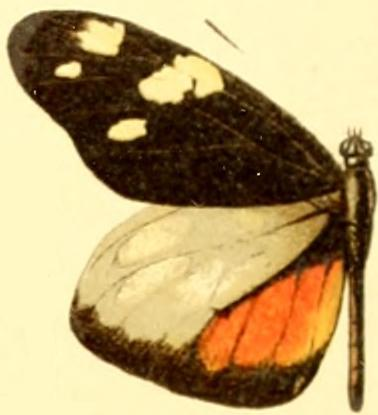
- D. e. desine

Scientific classification
- Kingdom: Animalia
- Phylum: Arthropoda
- Clade: Pancrustacea
- Class: Insecta
- Order: Lepidoptera
- Family: Pieridae
- Genus: Dismorphia
- Species: D. eunoe

Binomial name
- Dismorphia eunoe (Doubleday, 1844)

Synonyms
- Leptalis eunoe Doubleday, 1844; Leptalis euryope Lucas, 1852; Leptalis desine Hewitson, 1869; Leptalis deione Hewitson, 1869; Dismorphia hagaresa Butler, 1872

= Dismorphia eunoe =

Eunoe mimic-white

Species of butterfly

Dismorphia eunoe, the Eunoe mimic-white, is a butterfly in the family Pieridae. It is found from Mexico to Central America.

The wingspan is 29–33 mm (1.1–1.3 in).

The larvae feed on Inga species, including Inga stenophylla.

== Subspecies ==
The following subspecies are recognised:

- D. e. eunoe (Mexico)
- D. e. desine (Hewitson, 1869) (Nicaragua to Panama, Costa Rica)
- D. e. chamula Llorente & Luis, 1988 (Mexico)
- D. e. popoluca Llorente & Luis, 1988 (Mexico)
- D. e. noelia Lamas, 2004 (Panama)
