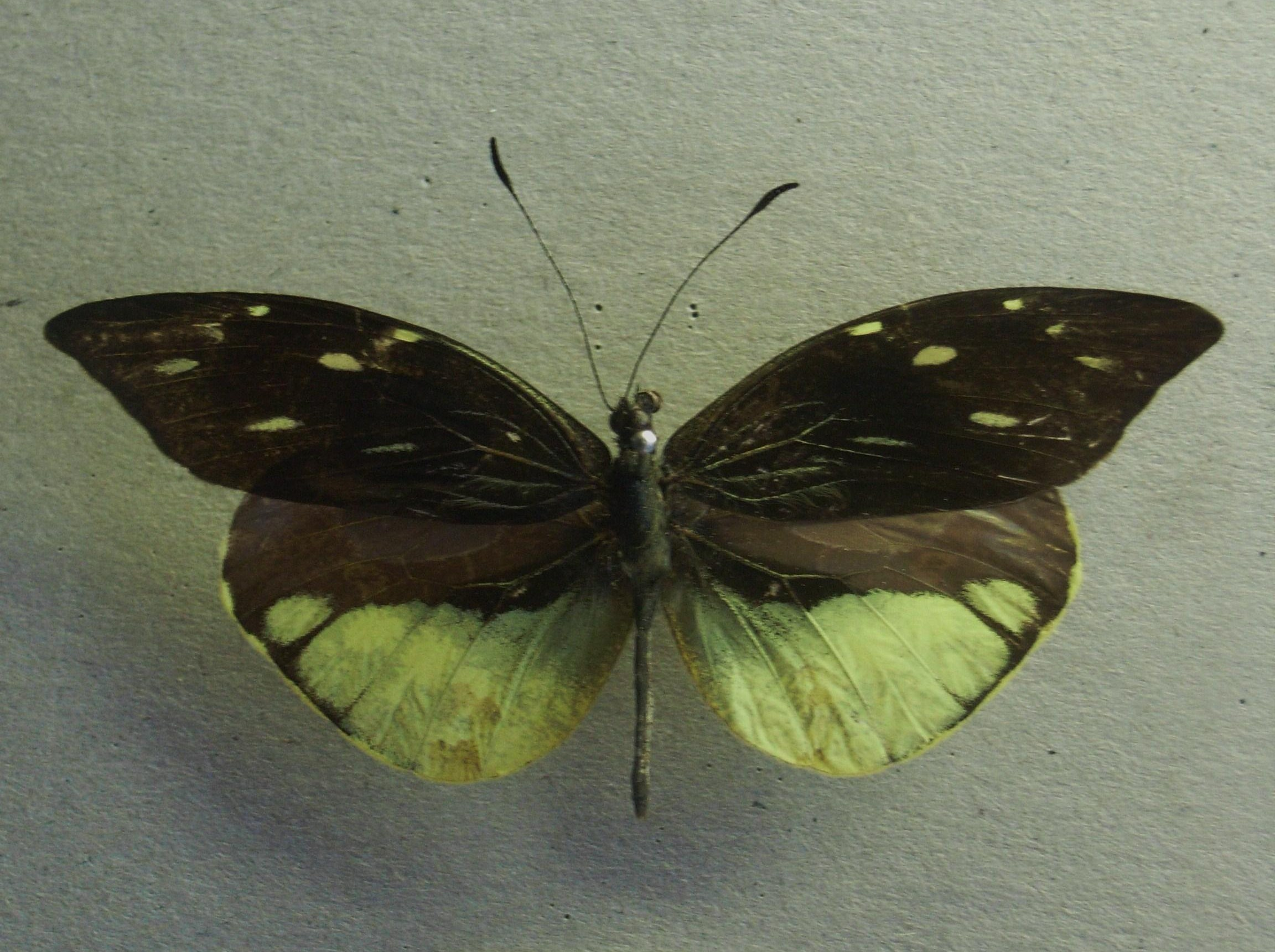

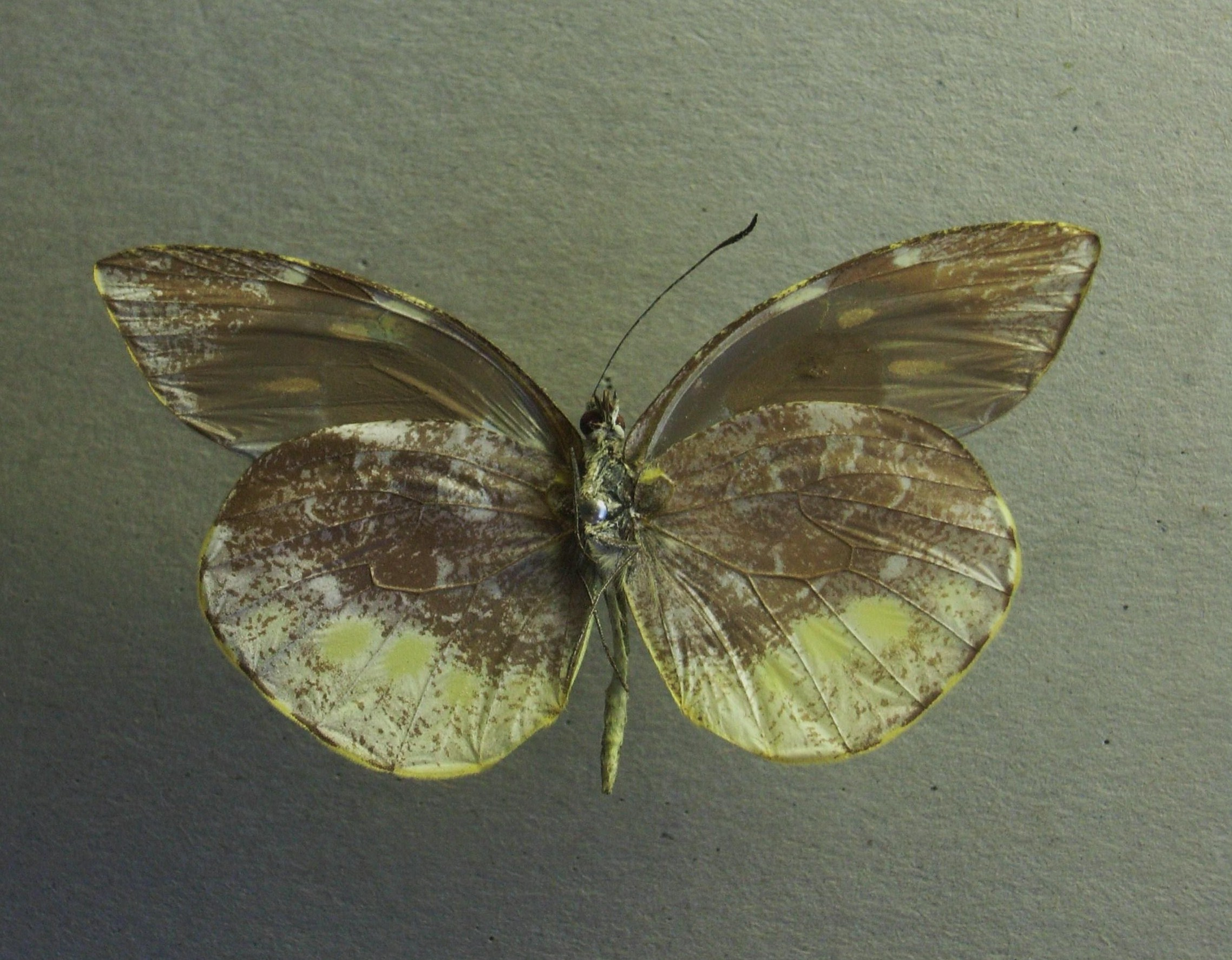

Scientific classification
- Domain: Eukaryota
- Kingdom: Animalia
- Phylum: Arthropoda
- Class: Insecta
- Order: Lepidoptera
- Family: Pieridae
- Genus: Lieinix
- Species: L. nemesis

Binomial name
- Lieinix nemesis (Latreille, [1813])

Synonyms
- Pieris nemesis Latreille, [1813]; Acmepteron nemesis; Dismorphia nemesis; Dismorphia nomesis obolal Martin, [1923] (nom. nud.); Leptalis atthis Doubleday, 1842; Dismorphia nomesis chara Martin, [1923] (nom. nud.); Lieinix nemesis megaera Lamas, 1979

= Lieinix nemesis =

Species of butterfly

Lieinix nemesis, the frosted mimic-white, nemesis mimic white or falcate dismorphia, is a butterfly in the family Pieridae. It is found from Mexico to Peru. The habitat consists of mid-elevation cloudforests.

The wingspan is 55–65 mm (2.2–2.6 in). Adults are sexually dimorphic.

The larvae probably feed on Inga species, including Inga mortoniana and Inga densiflora.

== Subspecies ==
The following subspecies are recognised:

- Lieinix nemesis nemesis (Ecuador)
- Lieinix nemesis nayaritensis Llorente, 1984 (Mexico)
- Lieinix nemesis atthis (Doubleday, 1842) (Mexico, El Salvador)
