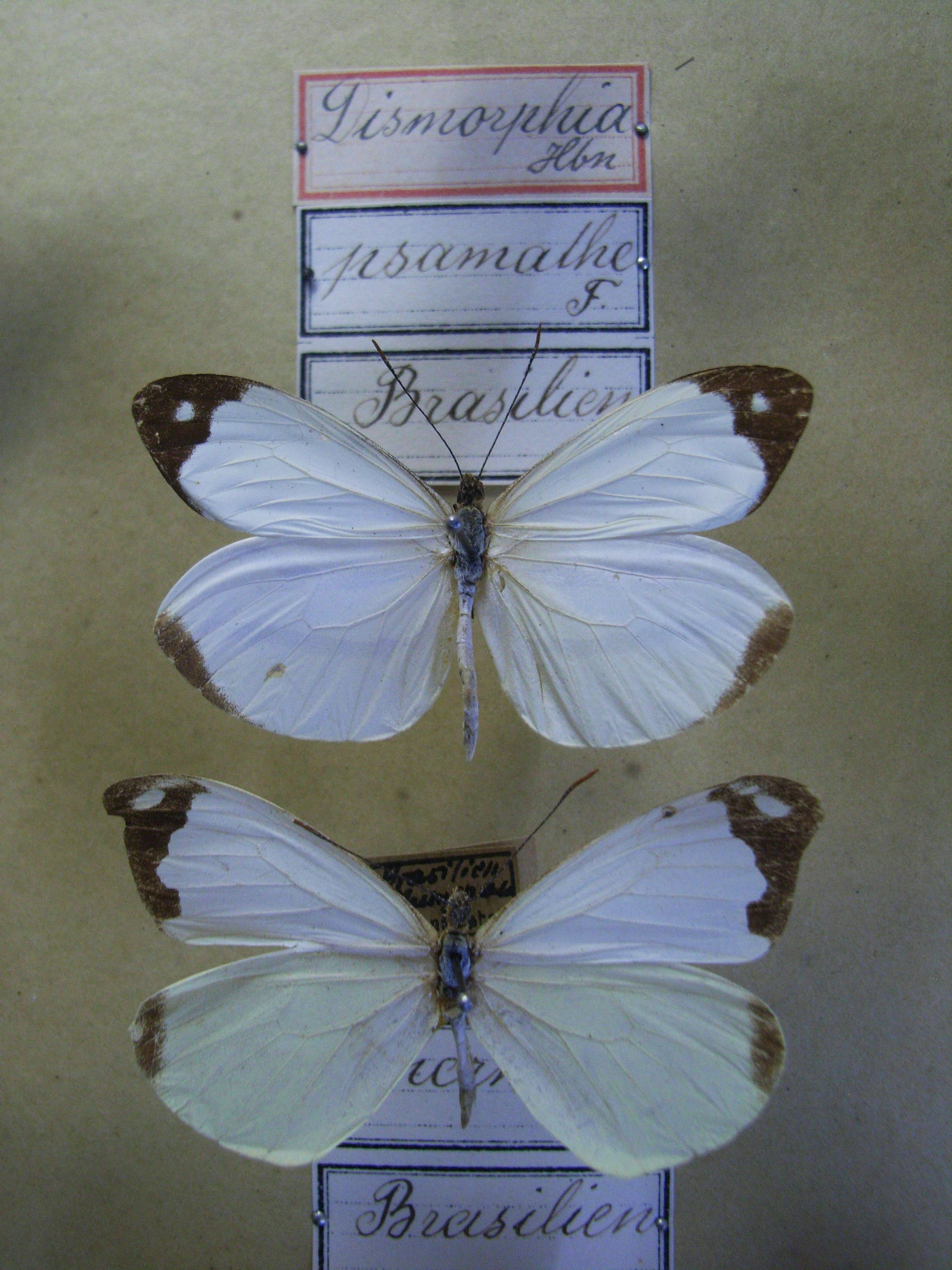
- Museum specimen

Scientific classification
- Domain: Eukaryota
- Kingdom: Animalia
- Phylum: Arthropoda
- Class: Insecta
- Order: Lepidoptera
- Family: Pieridae
- Genus: Enantia
- Species: E. lina

Binomial name
- Enantia lina (Herbst, 1792)

Synonyms
- Papilio lina Herbst, 1792; Papilio psamanthe Fabricius, 1793; Leptalis isodrita Boisduval, 1836; Leptalis dilis Boisduval, 1836; Leptalis kollari Doubleday, 1847 (nom. nud.); Leptalis kollari Lucas, 1852; Leptalis kollari Reakirt, 1865 (preocc.); Dismorphia acutipennis f. disjuncta Röber, 1909; Dismorphia delia Schweizer & Kay, 1941; Dismorphia psamathe ab. joannisi Dufrane, 1947; Enantia licinia punctalara Anken, 1995 (hyb.); Leptalis mercenaria C. & R. Felder, 1861; Dismorphia acutipennis f. llerasi Apolinar, 1926; Dismorphia cretacea Grose-Smith & Kirby, 1897; Dismorphia cretacea rovya (Martin, [1923]) (nom. nud.); Dismorphia cretacea vessela Martin, [1923] (nom. nud.); Enantia licinia licinia f. carnosa Baumann & Reissinger, 1969; Enantia versicolora eva Reissinger, 1970; Enantia versicolora elongata Reissinger, 1970; Enantia acutipennis Butler, 1896; Enantia marion Godman & Salvin, [1889]; Dismorphia mercenaria versicolora f. carnosa Fruhstorfer, 1912; Enantia licinia hoffmanni Llorente, 1984 (preocc.)

= Enantia lina =

Species of butterfly

Enantia lina, the white mimic white or lina mimic white, is a butterfly in the family Pieridae. It is found from Mexico to most of South America.

== Subspecies ==
The following subspecies are recognised:

- E. l. lina (Herbst, 1792)
- E. l. psamathe (Fabricius, 1793) (Uruguay, Brazil: Rio de Janeiro, Bahia, Rio Grande do Sul, Mato Grosso do Sul)
- E. l. mercenaria (C. & R. Felder, 1861) (Panama, Venezuela, Colombia)
- E. l. aphrodite (C. & R. Felder, 1865) (Brazil: Espírito Santo, Minas Gerais)
- E. l. galanthis (Bates, 1861) (Ecuador, Peru, Bolivia, Brazil: Amazonas)
- E. l. acutipennis Butler, 1896 (Trinidad)
- E. l. marion Godman & Salvin, [1889] (Mexico, Guatemala, Nicaragua, Panama)
- E. l. versicolora (Fruhstorfer, 1912) (Brazil: Pernambuco)
- E. l. virna Lamas, 2003 (Mexico)

== Gallery ==
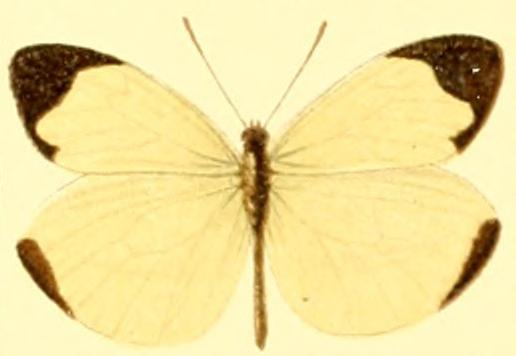
E. l. aphrodite male

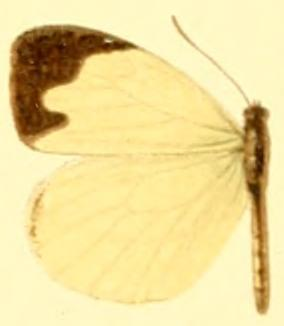
E. l. aphrodite female

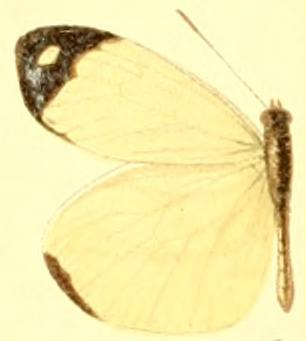
E. l. psamanthe male

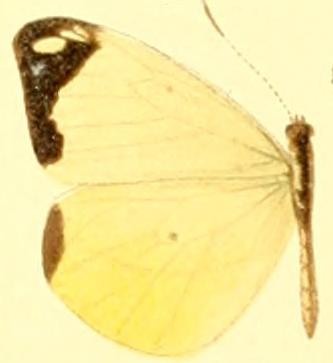
E. l. psamanthe female

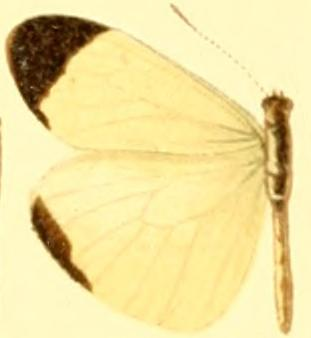
E. l. mercenaria male

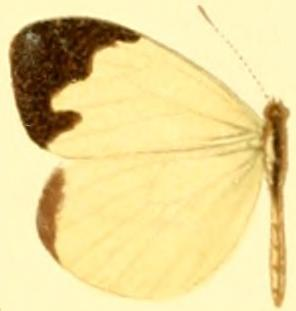
E. l. mercenaria female

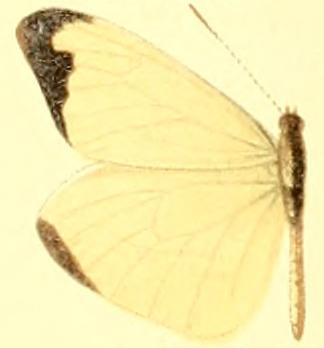
E. l. marion male

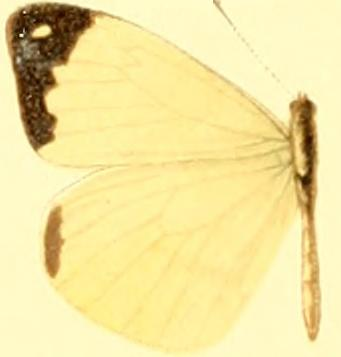
E. l. marion female
