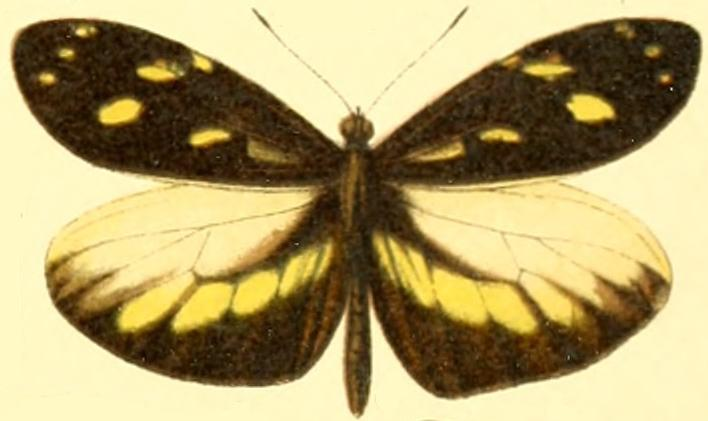
- Male
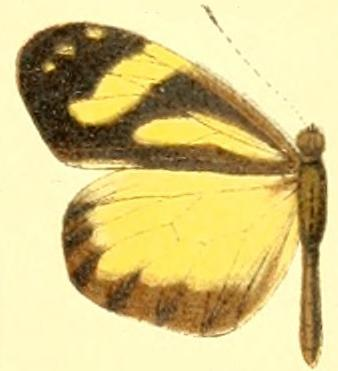
- Female

Scientific classification
- Kingdom: Animalia
- Phylum: Arthropoda
- Clade: Pancrustacea
- Class: Insecta
- Order: Lepidoptera
- Family: Pieridae
- Genus: Dismorphia
- Species: D. lua

Binomial name
- Dismorphia lua (Hewitson, 1869)

Synonyms
- Leptalis lua Hewitson, 1869

= Dismorphia lua =

Species of butterfly

Dismorphia lua is a butterfly in the family Pieridae. It is found from Costa Rica to Ecuador, Bolivia, Colombia and Peru.

The wingspan is about 53 mm (2.1 in).

== Subspecies ==
The following subspecies are recognised:

- Dismorphia lua lua (Ecuador)
- Dismorphia lua garleppi Staudinger, 1894 (Bolivia)
- Dismorphia lua idae Fassl, 1910 (Colombia)
- Dismorphia lua costaricensis (Schaus, 1913) (Costa Rica)
- Dismorphia lua roberta Lamas, 2004 (Peru)
