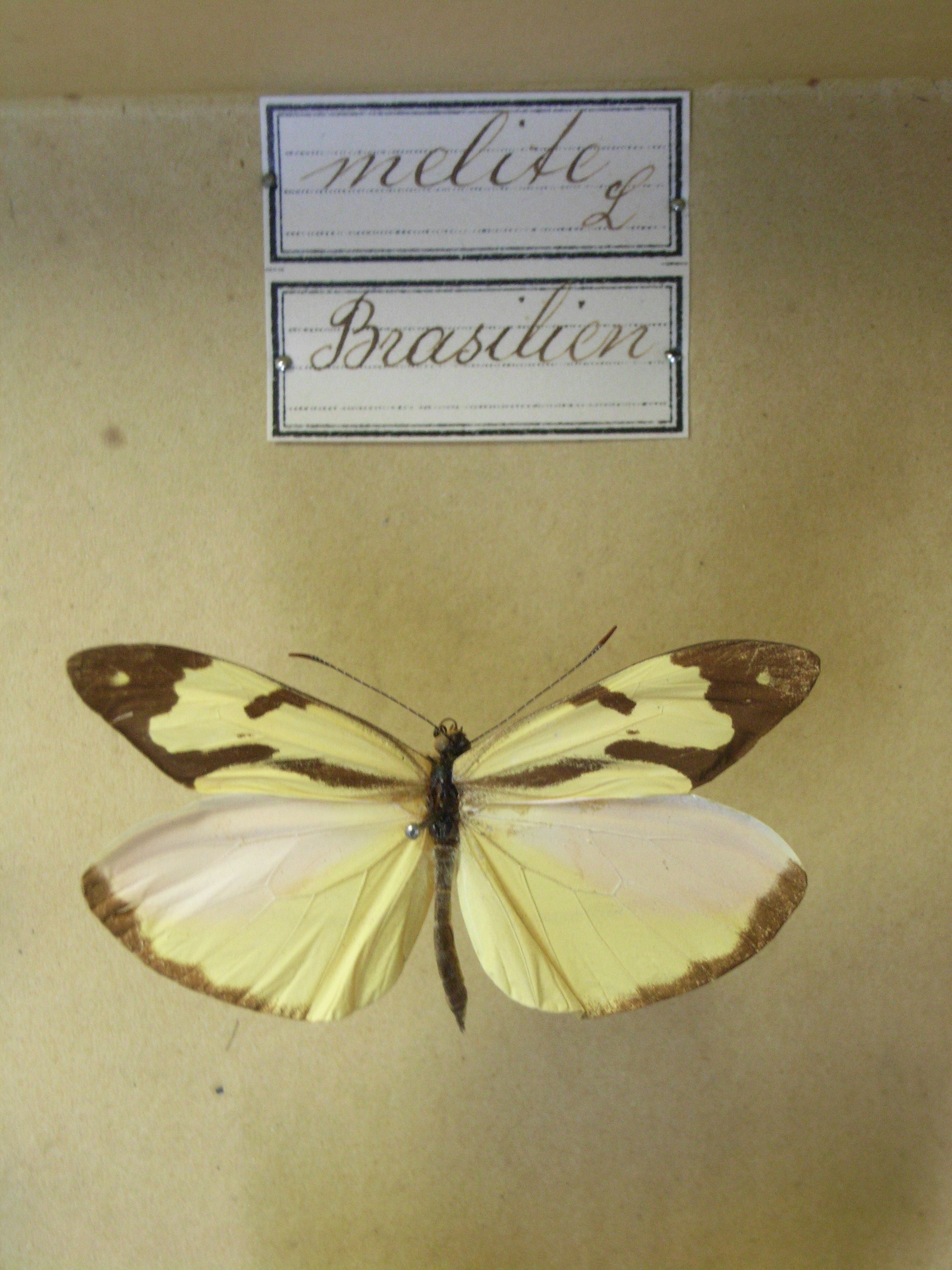

Scientific classification
- Kingdom: Animalia
- Phylum: Arthropoda
- Class: Insecta
- Order: Lepidoptera
- Family: Pieridae
- Genus: Enantia
- Species: E. melite

Binomial name
- Enantia melite (Linnaeus, 1763)

Synonyms
- Papilio melite Linnaeus, 1763; Leptalis melite; Dismorphia melite; Papilio licinia Cramer, [1777]; Papilio phronima Fabricius, 1793; Dismorphia colon Röber, 1909; Phalaena heteroclita Linnaeus, 1763 (nom. dub.); Dismorphia theugenis ab. immaculata Zischka, 1951; Dismorphia theugenis ab. flavimaculata Zischka, 1951; Dismorphia theugenis ab. continuescens Zischka, 1951; Dismorphia melite defigurata Martin, [1923] (nom. nud.); Dismorphia theugenis ab. juncta Dufrane, 1947; Enantia theugenis zischkai Baumann & Reissinger, 1969

= Enantia melite =

Species of butterfly

Enantia melite is a species of butterfly that is found from Central America to the Amazon Basin. It has a wingspan of 48–52 millimetres (1.9–2.0 in), and is very variable. It lives in cloud forest and transitional forest, at altitudes of 400–1,800 metres (1,300–5,900 ft).

== Subspecies ==
- E. m. melite (Surinam)
- E. m. theugenis (Doubleday, 1848) (Bolivia, Peru)
- E. m. linealis (Prüffer, 1922) (Peru)
- E. m. vilma Lamas, 2004 (Brazil: Rondônia)

== Gallery ==
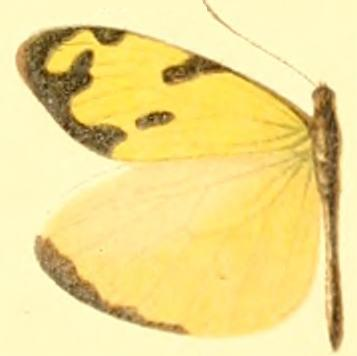
E. m. melite male

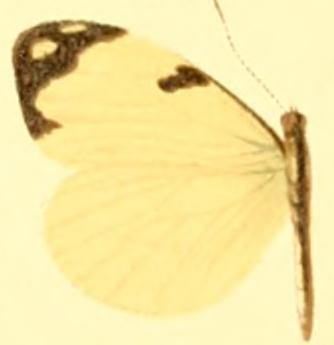
E. m. melite female

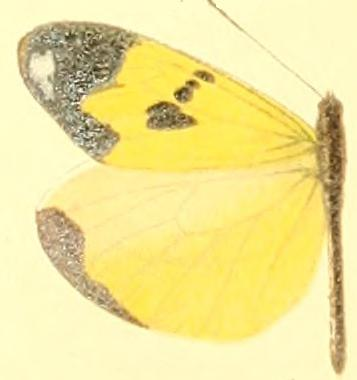
E. m. theugenis
