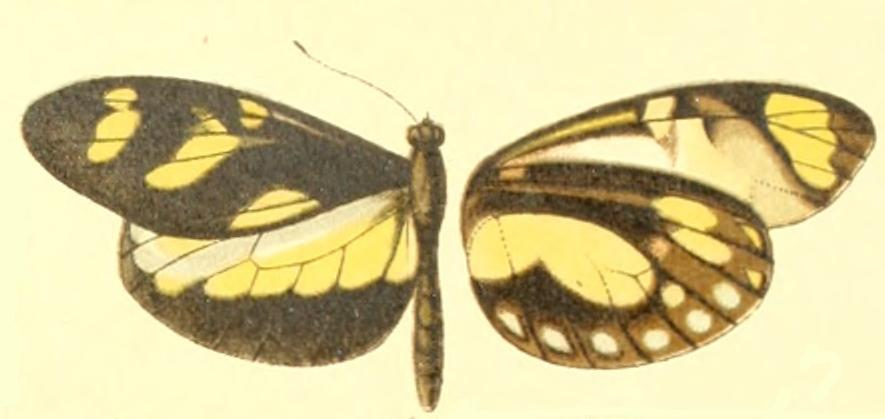
- Dismorphia laja carthesis

Scientific classification
- Kingdom: Animalia
- Phylum: Arthropoda
- Clade: Pancrustacea
- Class: Insecta
- Order: Lepidoptera
- Family: Pieridae
- Genus: Dismorphia
- Species: D. laja

Binomial name
- Dismorphia laja (Cramer, [1779])

Synonyms
- Papilio laja Cramer, [1779]; Papilio laia; Dismorphia mechanitina Röber, 1924

= Dismorphia laja =

Species of butterfly

Dismorphia laja is a butterfly in the family Pieridae. It is found in northern South America.

Adults are sexually dimorphic.

== Subspecies ==
The following subspecies are recognised:

- Dismorphia laja laja (Surinam)
- Dismorphia laja lysianax (Hewitson, [1860]) (Peru)
- Dismorphia laja tapajona (Bates, 1861) (Brazil: Pará, Rondônia)
- Dismorphia laja carthesis (Hewitson, 1869) (Ecuador, Guyana)
- Dismorphia laja tricolor Grose-Smith & Kirby, 1897 (Colombia)
- Dismorphia laja jurua Röber, 1924 (Brazil: Amazonas)
- Dismorphia laja spectabilis Avinoff, 1926 (Bolivia)
- Dismorphia laja koenigi Baumann & Reissinger, 1969 (Peru)
- Dismorphia laja rosina Lamas, 2004 (Peru)

== Gallery ==
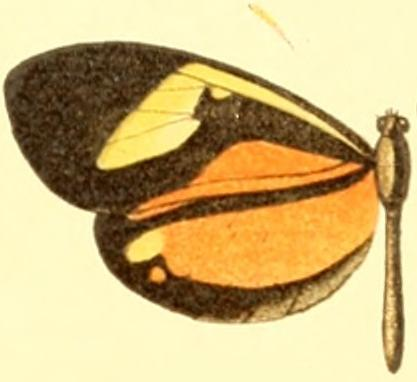
Dismorphia laja lysianax

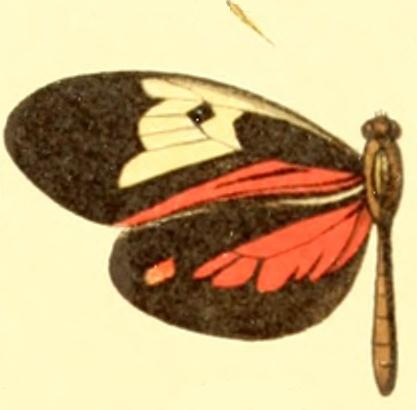
Dismorphia laja tricolor
