= Dismorphia niepelti =

Scientific classification
- Kingdom: Animalia
- Phylum: Arthropoda
- Clade: Pancrustacea
- Class: Insecta
- Order: Lepidoptera
- Family: Pieridae
- Genus: Dismorphia
- Species: D. niepelti

Binomial name
- Dismorphia niepelti Weymer, 1909

Synonyms
- Dismorphia niepelti stammi Baumann & Reissinger, 1969

Species of butterfly

Dismorphia niepelti is a butterfly in the family Pieridae. It is found in Ecuador and Peru.

The wingspan is 56–58 mm (2.2–2.3 in).
