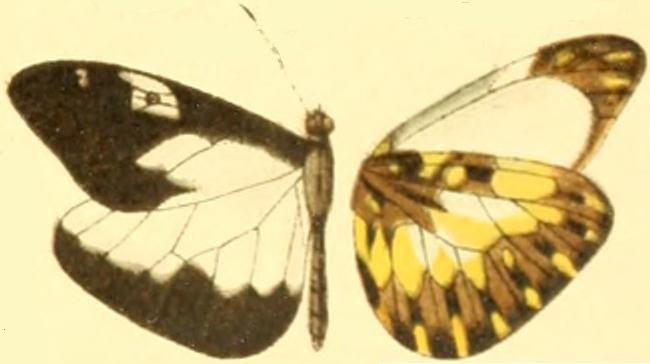

Scientific classification
- Kingdom: Animalia
- Phylum: Arthropoda
- Clade: Pancrustacea
- Class: Insecta
- Order: Lepidoptera
- Family: Pieridae
- Genus: Dismorphia
- Species: D. lygdamis

Binomial name
- Dismorphia lygdamis (Hewitson, 1869)

Synonyms
- Leptalis lygdamis Hewitson, 1869; Leptalis pappa Herrich-Schäffer, 1867 (nom. nud.); Leptalis pappa Prittwitz, 1871 (unavailable)

= Dismorphia lygdamis =

Species of butterfly

Dismorphia lygdamis, the catasticta mimic or Lygdamis mimic white, is a butterfly in the family Pieridae. It is found in Ecuador and Peru. The habitat consists of cloud forests.

The wingspan is about 50 mm (2.0 in). Adults appears to be a mimic of Catasticta sinapina.

== Subspecies ==
The following subspecies are recognised:

- Dismorphia lygdamis lygdamis (Ecuador)
- Dismorphia lygdamis doris Baumann & Reissinger, 1969 (Peru)
- Dismorphia lygdamis beatrix Lamas, 2004 (Peru)
