= Dismorphia hyposticta =

Scientific classification
- Kingdom: Animalia
- Phylum: Arthropoda
- Clade: Pancrustacea
- Class: Insecta
- Order: Lepidoptera
- Family: Pieridae
- Genus: Dismorphia
- Species: D. hyposticta

Binomial name
- Dismorphia hyposticta (C. & R. Felder, 1861)

Synonyms
- Leptalis hyposticta C. & R. Felder, 1861

Species of butterfly

Dismorphia hyposticta is a butterfly in the family Pieridae. It is found in Ecuador, Venezuela, Colombia and Peru.

The wingspan is about 51 mm (2.0 in).

== Subspecies ==
The following subspecies are recognised:

- Dismorphia hyposticta hyposticta (Venezuela)
- Dismorphia hyposticta manuelita Fassl, 1910 (Colombia)
- Dismorphia hyposticta ophelia Lamas, 2004 (Peru)
- Dismorphia hyposticta paulina Lamas, 2004 (Peru)
