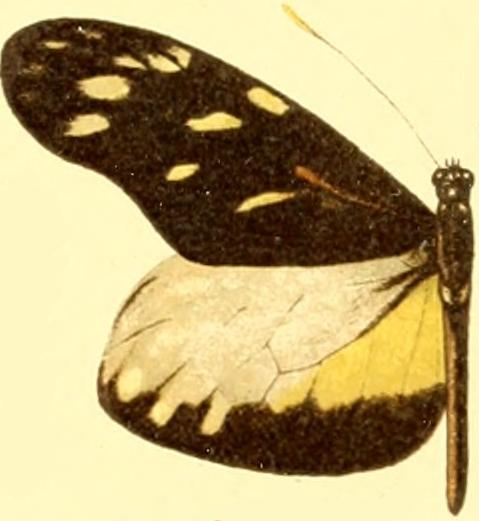
- Male
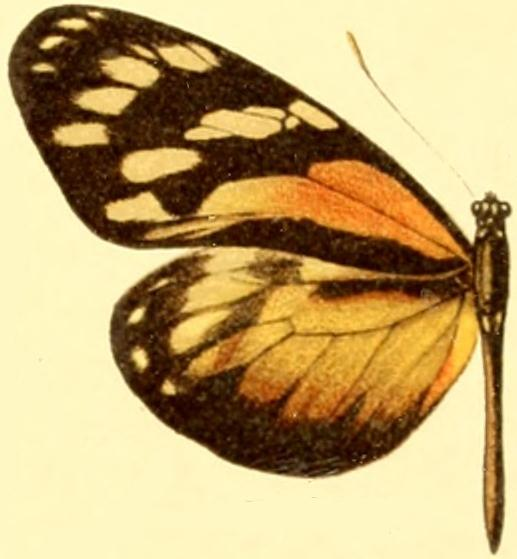
- Female

Scientific classification
- Kingdom: Animalia
- Phylum: Arthropoda
- Class: Insecta
- Order: Lepidoptera
- Family: Pieridae
- Genus: Patia
- Species: P. cordillera

Binomial name
- Patia cordillera (C. & R. Felder, 1862)

Synonyms
- Leptalis cordillera C. & R. Felder, 1862; Dismorphia cordillera; Dismorphia sororna Butler, 1872; Dismorphia myris Godman & Salvin, [1889]; Dismorphia erica Bargmann, 1929 (nom. nud.)

= Patia cordillera =

Species of butterfly

Patia cordillera is a butterfly in the family Pieridae. It is found from Costa Rica to Colombia and Ecuador.

The wingspan is about 80 mm (3.1 in).

== Subspecies ==
The following subspecies are recognised:

- P. c. cordillera (Colombia)
- P. c. larunda (Hewitson, 1869) (Ecuador)
- P. c. sororna (Butler, 1872) (Costa Rica, Panama)
- P. c. thecla (Bargmann, 1929) (Colombia)

== Gallery ==
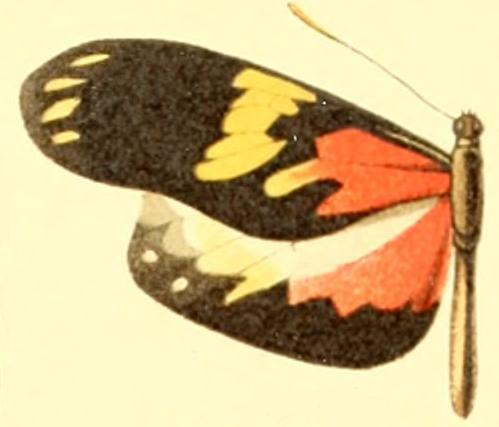
P. c. larunda

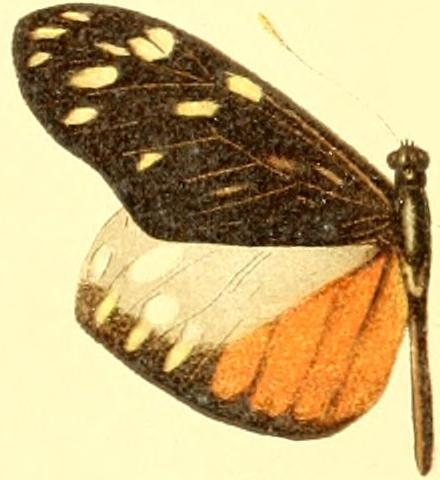
P. c. sororna male

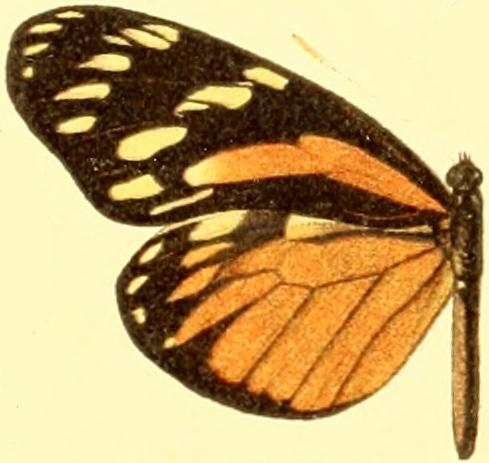
P. c. sororna female
