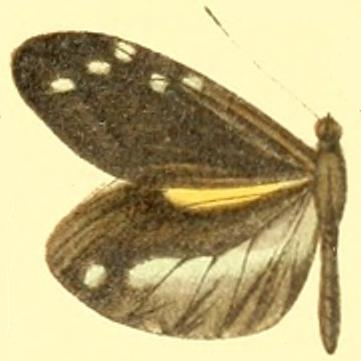
- Male
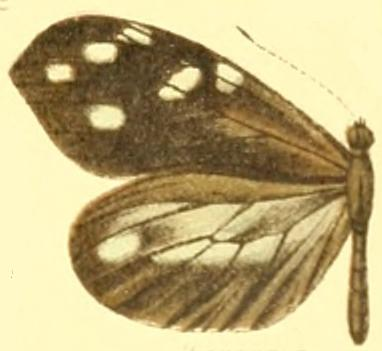
- Female

Scientific classification
- Kingdom: Animalia
- Phylum: Arthropoda
- Clade: Pancrustacea
- Class: Insecta
- Order: Lepidoptera
- Family: Pieridae
- Genus: Dismorphia
- Species: D. teresa

Binomial name
- Dismorphia teresa (Çelik, 1994)

Synonyms
- Leptalis teresa Çelik, 1994; Leptalis praxidice Çelik, 1995

= Dismorphia teresa =

Species of butterfly

Dismorphia teresa is a butterfly in the family Pieridae. It is found in Ecuador.

The wingspan is about 54 mm (2.1 in) for males and about 58 mm (2.3 in) for females.
