= Dismorphia boliviana =

Scientific classification
- Kingdom: Animalia
- Phylum: Arthropoda
- Clade: Pancrustacea
- Class: Insecta
- Order: Lepidoptera
- Family: Pieridae
- Genus: Dismorphia
- Species: D. boliviana

Binomial name
- Dismorphia boliviana Forster, 1955

Species of butterfly

Dismorphia boliviana is a butterfly in the family Pieridae. It is found in Bolivia.

Adults have white undersides that are mottled in grey and yellow.
