= Pseudopieris viridula =

Scientific classification
- Domain: Eukaryota
- Kingdom: Animalia
- Phylum: Arthropoda
- Class: Insecta
- Order: Lepidoptera
- Family: Pieridae
- Genus: Pseudopieris
- Species: P. viridula

Binomial name
- Pseudopieris viridula (C. & R. Felder, 1861)

Synonyms
- Leptalis viridula C. & R. Felder, 1861

Species of butterfly

Pseudopieris viridula is a butterfly in the family Pieridae. It is found in Venezuela, Ecuador, Colombia and Peru.

== Subspecies ==
The following subspecies are recognised:

- Pseudopieris viridula viridula (Colombia)
- Pseudopieris viridula mauritia Lamas, 2004 (Venezuela)
- Pseudopieris viridula mimaripa De Marmels, Clavijo & Chacín, 2003 (Venezuela)
- Pseudopieris viridula zulma Lamas, 2004 (Peru)
