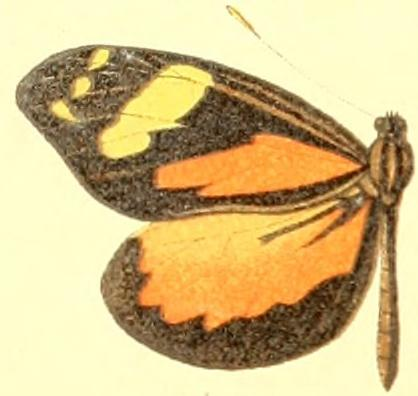
- Male
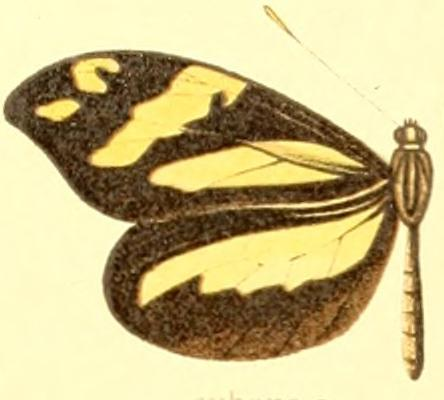
- Female

Scientific classification
- Kingdom: Animalia
- Phylum: Arthropoda
- Clade: Pancrustacea
- Class: Insecta
- Order: Lepidoptera
- Family: Pieridae
- Genus: Dismorphia
- Species: D. cubana

Binomial name
- Dismorphia cubana (Herrich-Schäffer, 1862)

Synonyms
- Leptalis cubana Herrich-Schäffer, 1862

= Dismorphia cubana =

Cuban dismorphia

Species of butterfly

Dismorphia cubana, the Cuban dismorphia, is a butterfly in the family Pieridae. It is endemic to Cuba.
