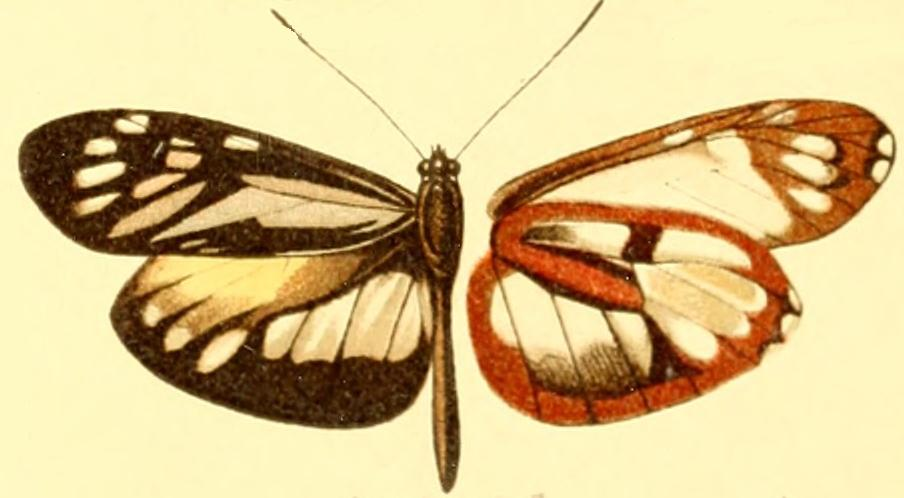
- Male
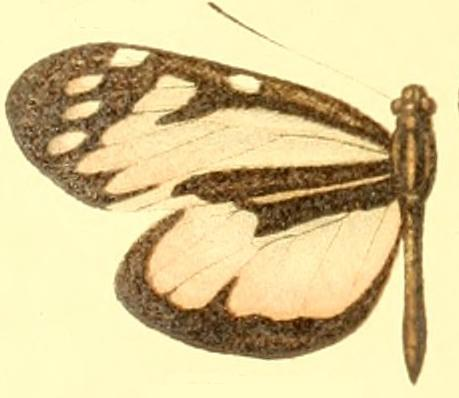
- Female

Scientific classification
- Domain: Eukaryota
- Kingdom: Animalia
- Phylum: Arthropoda
- Class: Insecta
- Order: Lepidoptera
- Family: Pieridae
- Genus: Patia
- Species: P. rhetes

Binomial name
- Patia rhetes (Hewitson, [1857])

Synonyms
- Leptalis rhetes Hewitson, [1857]; Dismorphia rhetes; Dismorphia hewitsonii Kirby, 1881

= Patia rhetes =

Species of butterfly

Patia rhetes is a butterfly in the family Pieridae. It is found in Colombia, Bolivia, and Ecuador.
