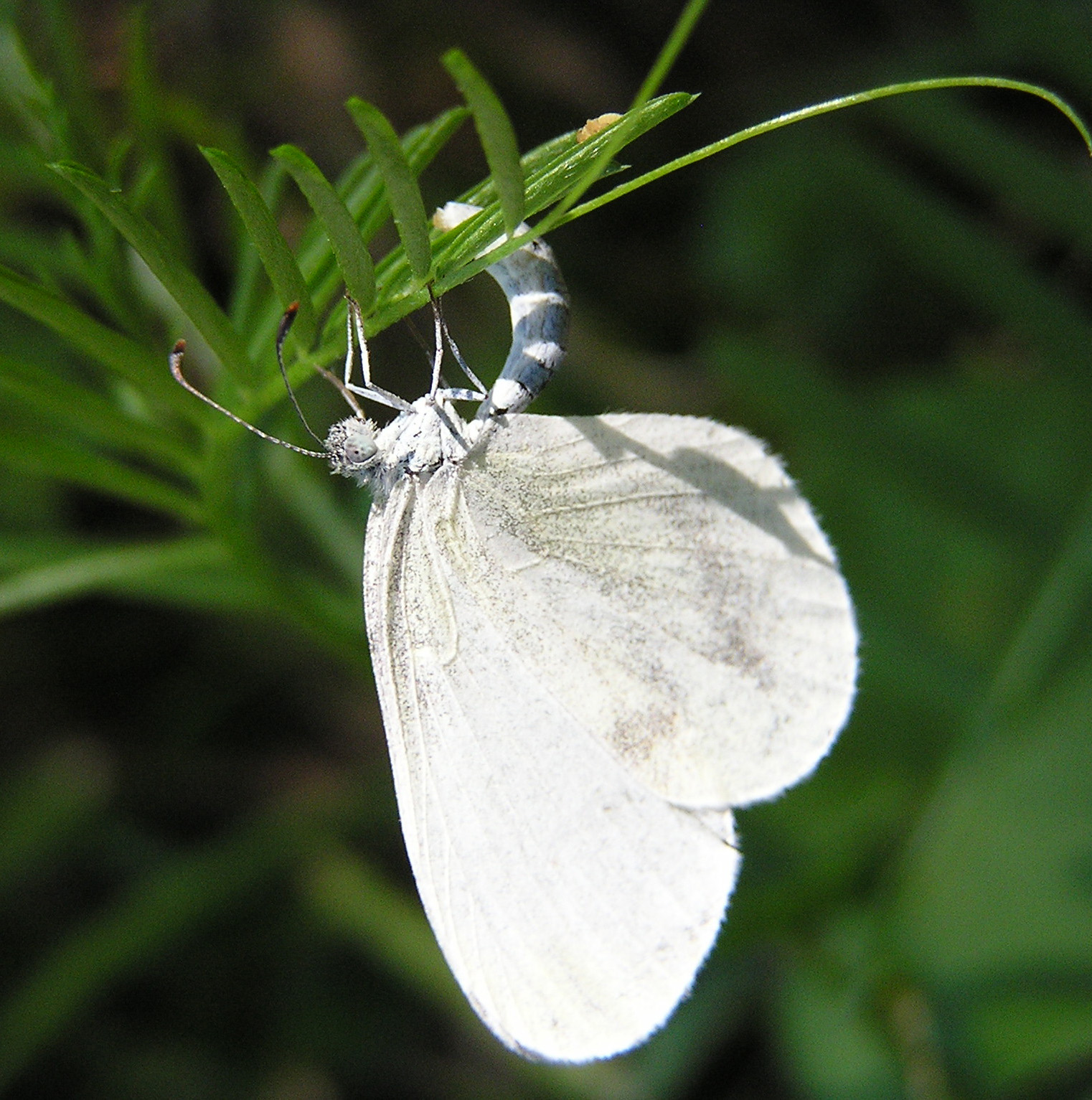
- Leptidea sinapis

Scientific classification
- Domain: Eukaryota
- Kingdom: Animalia
- Phylum: Arthropoda
- Class: Insecta
- Order: Lepidoptera
- Family: Pieridae
- Subfamily: Dismorphiinae; Schatz, 1887

= Dismorphiinae =

Subfamily of butterflies

Dismorphiinae, the mimic sulphurs, is a subfamily of butterflies from the family Pieridae. It consists of about 100 species in seven genera, distributed mainly in the Neotropical region, of which only one species occurs in North America and one genus, Leptidea, is in the Palaeartic region.

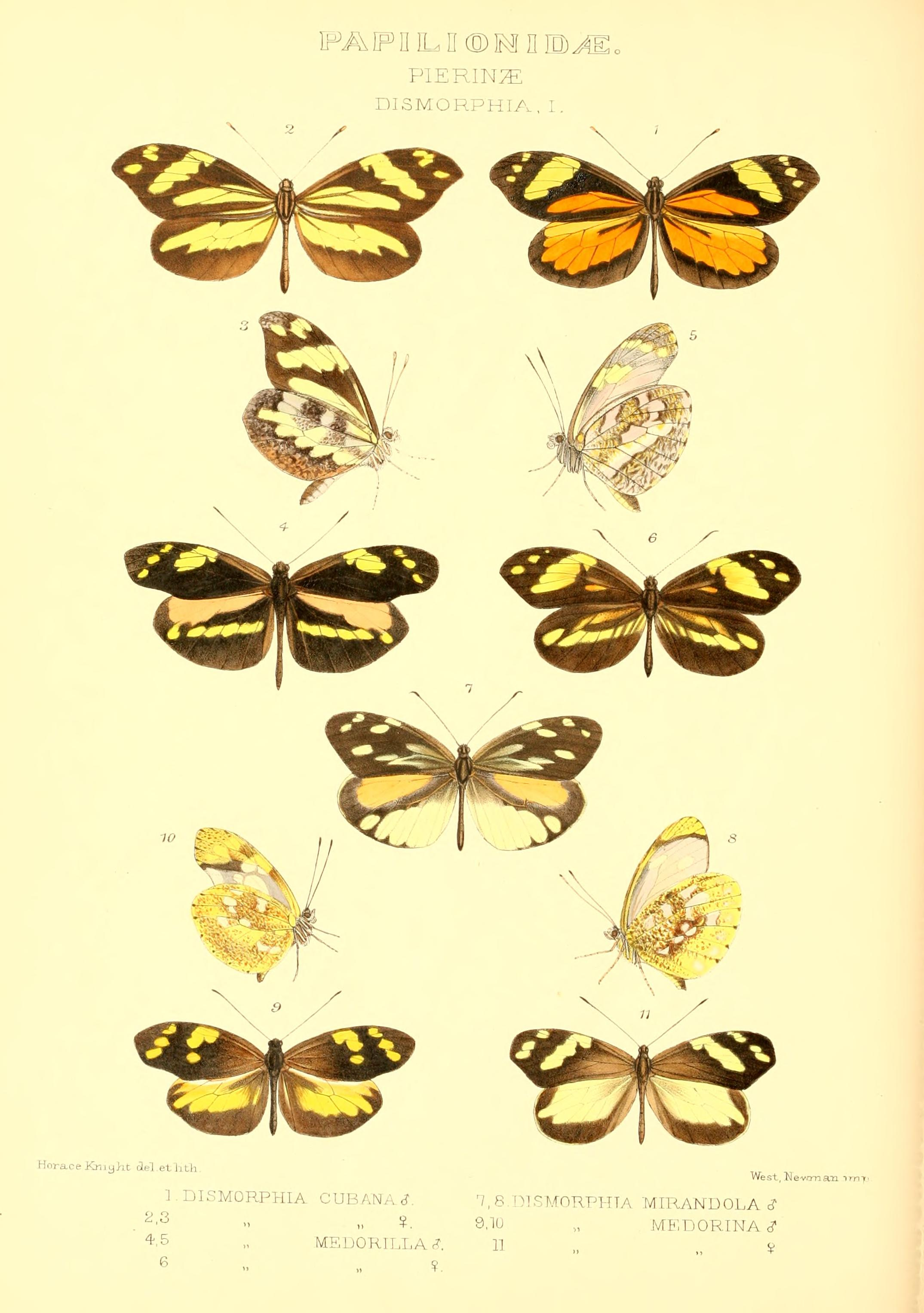

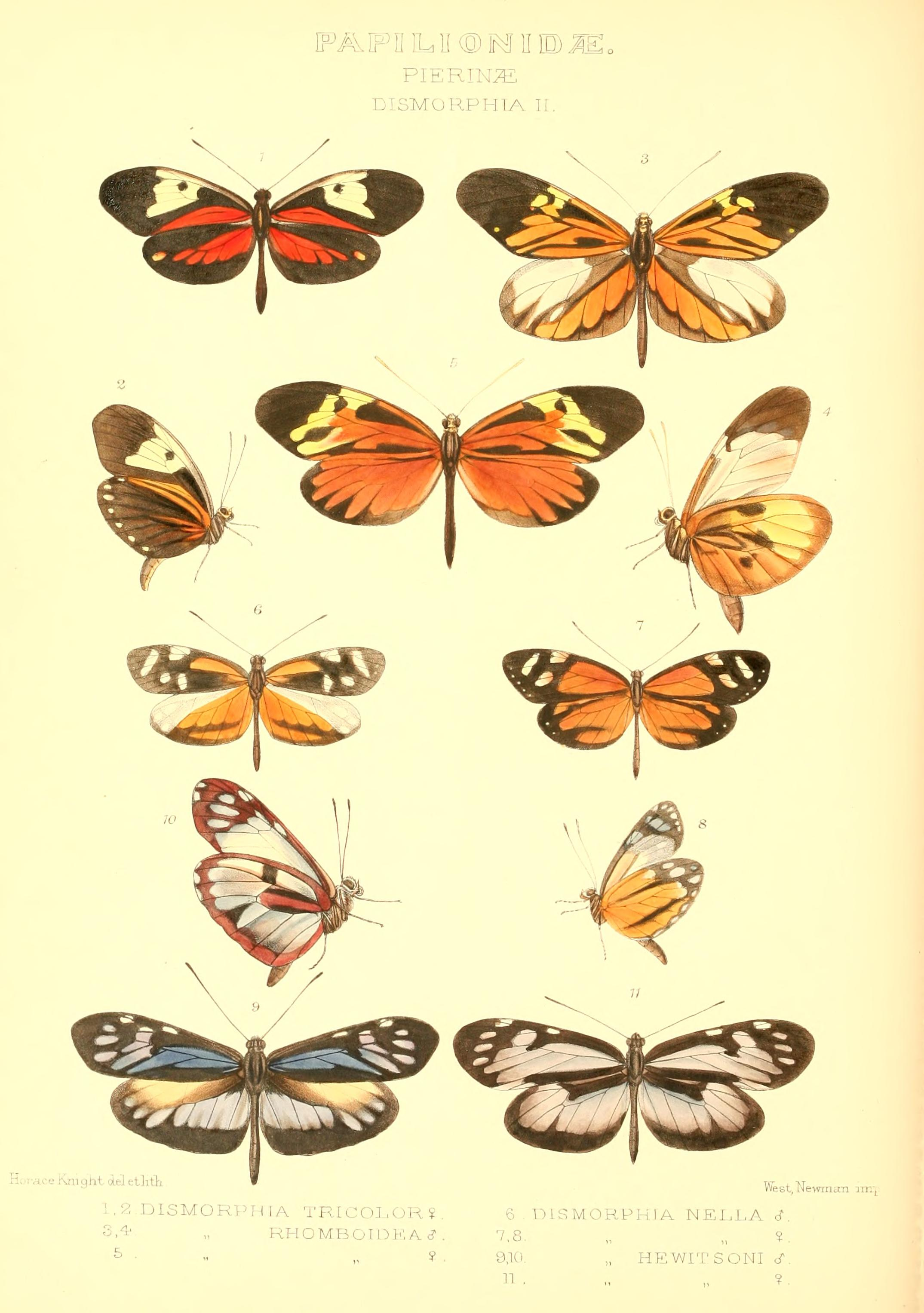

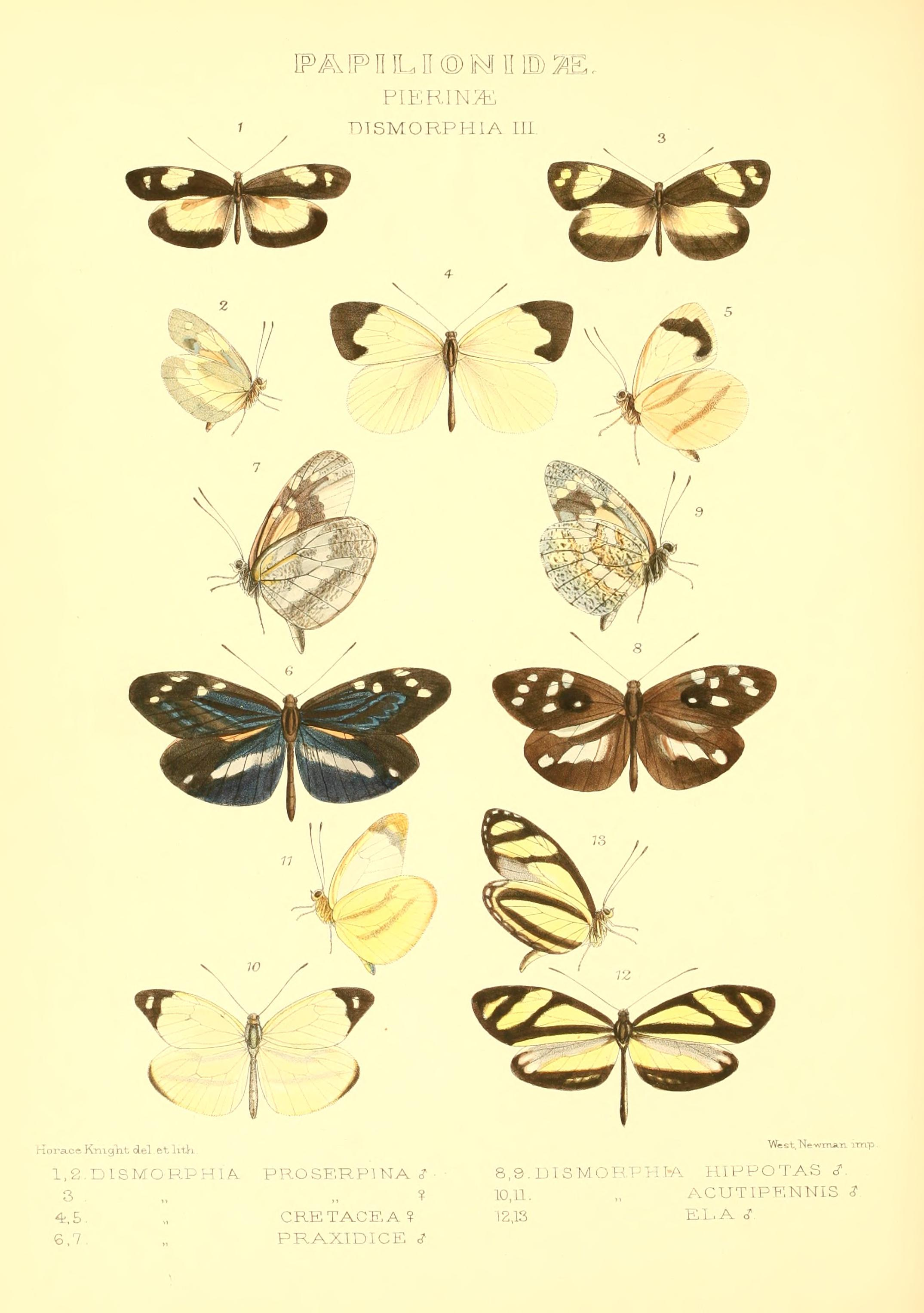

== Genera ==
- Dismorphia Hübner, 1816
- Enantia Hübner, 1819
- Lieinix Gray, 1832
- Leptidea Billberg, 1820
- Moschoneura Butler, 1870
- Patia Klots, 1933
- Pseudopieris Godman & Salvin, 1890
