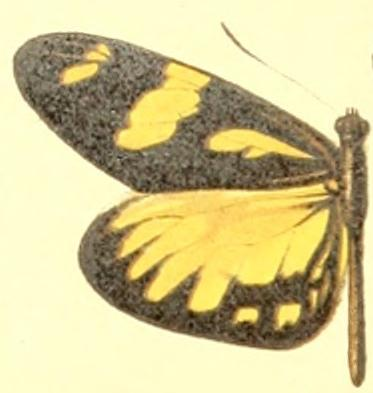

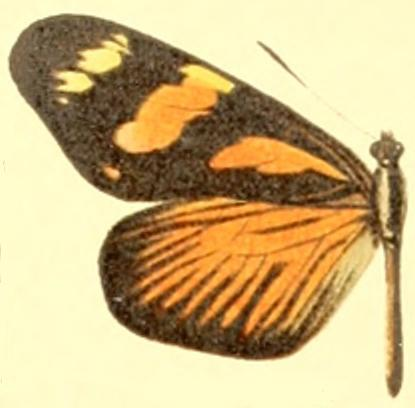

Scientific classification
- Kingdom: Animalia
- Phylum: Arthropoda
- Clade: Pancrustacea
- Class: Insecta
- Order: Lepidoptera
- Family: Pieridae
- Genus: Dismorphia
- Species: D. melia

Binomial name
- Dismorphia melia (Godart, [1824])

Synonyms
- Pieris melia Godart, [1824]; Leptalis eumara Doubleday, 1848; Leptalis acraeoides Hewitson, 1851; Leptalis thalia Müller, 1876; Dismorphia mimetica Staudinger, 1884; Dismorphia actinote Kaye, 1911 (nom. nud.); Dismorphia melia moena Martin, [1923] (nom. nud.); Dismorphia melia f. metallescens Hoffmann, 1935

= Dismorphia melia =

Species of butterfly

Dismorphia melia is a butterfly in the family Pieridae. It is found in Brazil, including Minas Gerais, Santa Catarina and Rio de Janeiro.
