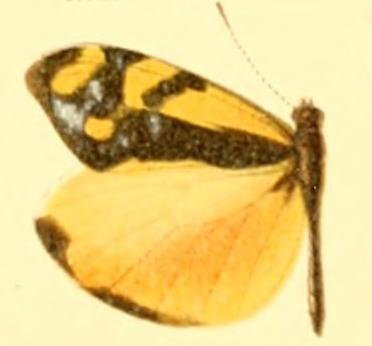

Scientific classification
- Kingdom: Animalia
- Phylum: Arthropoda
- Clade: Pancrustacea
- Class: Insecta
- Order: Lepidoptera
- Family: Pieridae
- Genus: Enantia
- Species: E. jethys

Binomial name
- Enantia jethys (Boisduval, 1836)

Synonyms
- Leptalis jethys Boisduval, 1836; Leptalis cornelia C. & R. Felder, [1865]; Dismorhpia cornelia

= Enantia jethys =

Species of butterfly

Enantia jethys, the jethys mimic white or bold mimic white, is a butterfly in the family Pieridae. It is found in Mexico and Guatemala.
