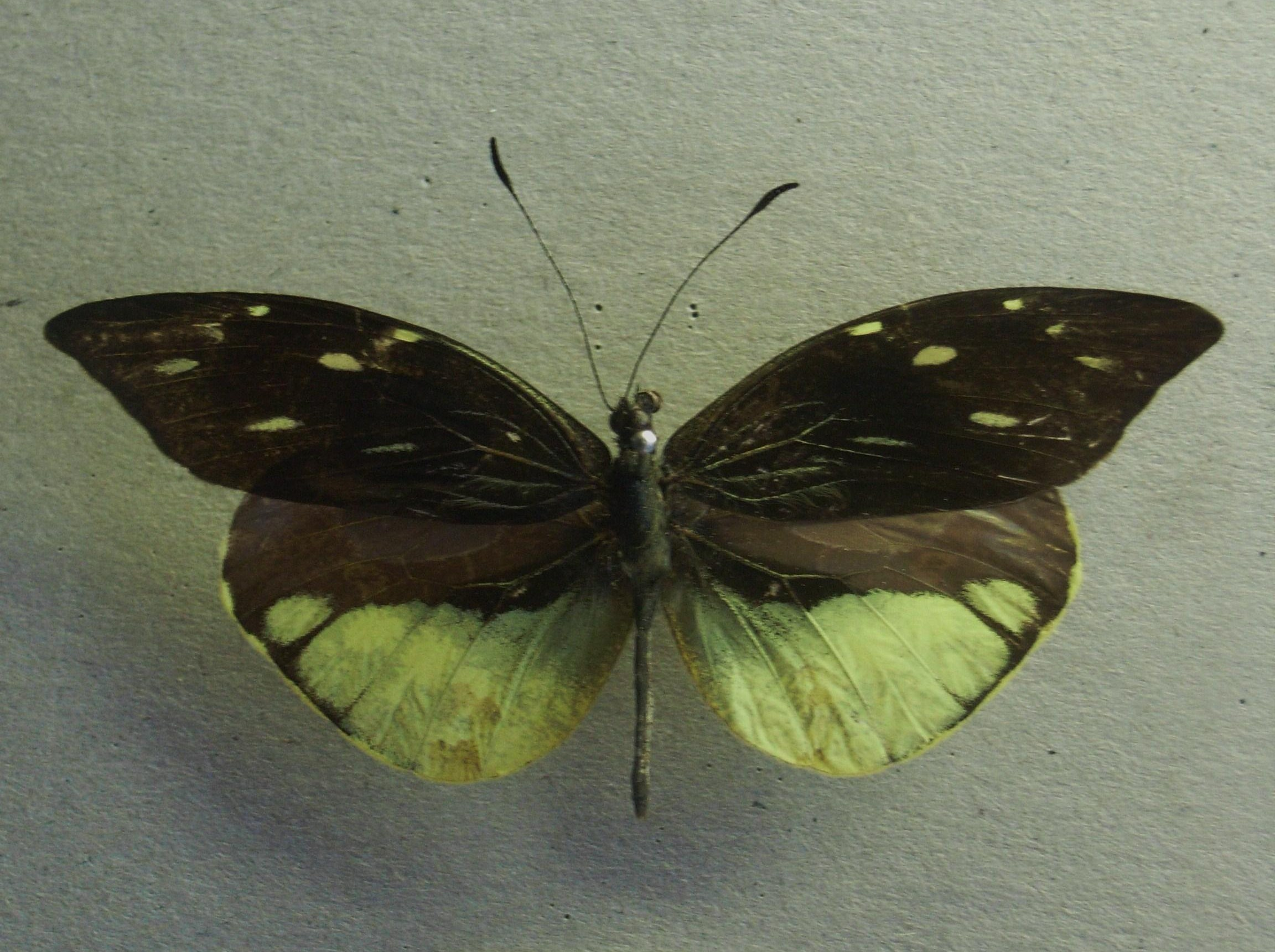
- Lieinix nemesis

Scientific classification
- Domain: Eukaryota
- Kingdom: Animalia
- Phylum: Arthropoda
- Class: Insecta
- Order: Lepidoptera
- Family: Pieridae
- Subfamily: Dismorphiinae
- Genus: Lieinix; Gray, 1832

Species
- See text

Synonyms
- Acmepteron Godman & Salvin, 1889

= Lieinix =

Butterfly genus in family Pieridae

Lieinix is a genus of butterflies in the subfamily Dismorphiinae. It is native to the Americas.

== Species ==
- Lieinix christa (Reissinger, 1970)
- Lieinix cinerascens (Salvin, 1871) – bluish mimic-white
- Lieinix lala (Godman & Salvin, 1889) – dark mimic-white
- Lieinix neblina J. Maza & R.G. Maza, 1984 – Guerrero mimic-white
- Lieinix nemesis (Latreille, [1813]) – frosted mimic-white
- Lieinix viridifascia (Butler, 1872) – greenish mimic-white
