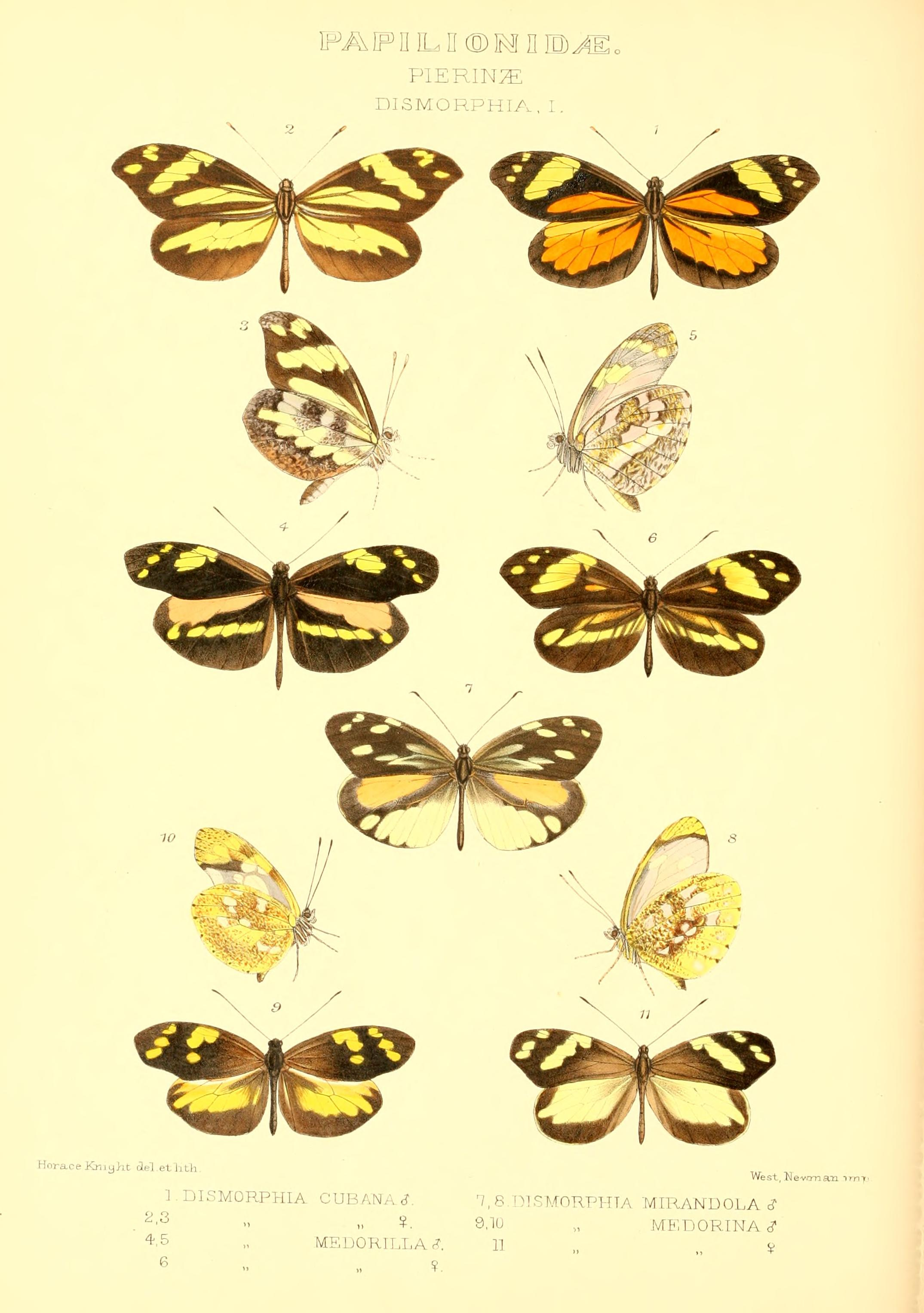
- Dismorphia medorilla figures 4,5 (male), 6 (female)

Scientific classification
- Kingdom: Animalia
- Phylum: Arthropoda
- Clade: Pancrustacea
- Class: Insecta
- Order: Lepidoptera
- Family: Pieridae
- Genus: Dismorphia
- Species: D. medorilla

Binomial name
- Dismorphia medorilla (Hewitson, 1877)

Synonyms
- Leptalis medorilla Hewitson, 1877

= Dismorphia medorilla =

Species of butterfly

Dismorphia medorilla is a butterfly in the family Pieridae. It is found in Ecuador, Bolivia and Peru.

== Subspecies ==
The following subspecies are recognised:

- Dismorphia medorilla medorilla (Ecuador)
- Dismorphia medorilla buchtieni Fassl, 1915 (Bolivia)
- Dismorphia medorilla sarita Lamas, 2004 (Peru)
