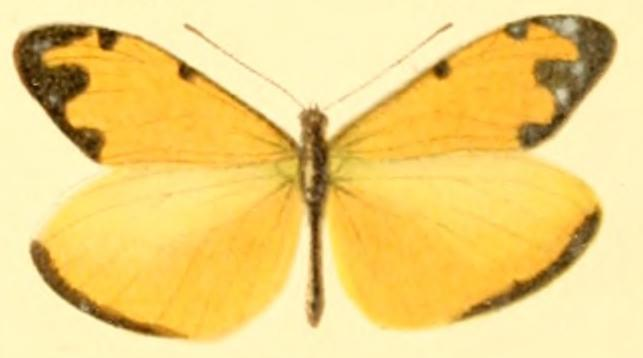
- Enantia albania amalia

Scientific classification
- Domain: Eukaryota
- Kingdom: Animalia
- Phylum: Arthropoda
- Class: Insecta
- Order: Lepidoptera
- Family: Pieridae
- Genus: Enantia
- Species: E. albania

Binomial name
- Enantia albania (Bates, 1864)

Synonyms
- Leptalis albania Bates, 1864; Leptalis mita Reakirt, [1867]; Enantia amalia f. immaculata Hoffmann, 1940

= Enantia albania =

Costa-spotted mimic-white

Species of butterfly

Enantia albania, the costa-spotted mimic-white, is a butterfly in the family Pieridae. It is native to tropical Mexico and Central America, but rare strays have been reported from the Lower Rio Grande Valley in Texas. The habitat consists of low- to mid-elevation tropical forests and coffee plantations.

The wingspan is 22–30 mm (0.87–1.18 in). Adults are on wing for a long period in Mexico, but have only been reported in September in southern Texas. There are multiple generations per year on Cuba and Hispaniola. They feed on flower nectar and bird droppings in the forest understory.

The larvae probably feed on Fabaceae species.

== Subspecies ==
The following subspecies are recognised:

- Enantia albania albania (Guatemala, Mexico)
- Enantia albania amalia (Staudinger, 1884) (Panama, Nicaragua)
- Enantia albania nuria Lamas, 2004 (Ecuador)
