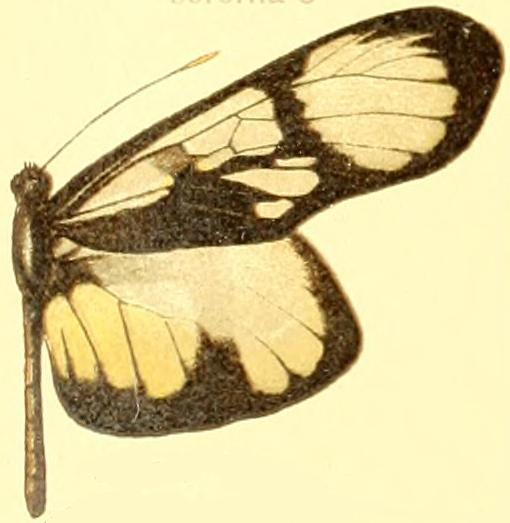

Scientific classification
- Domain: Eukaryota
- Kingdom: Animalia
- Phylum: Arthropoda
- Class: Insecta
- Order: Lepidoptera
- Family: Pieridae
- Genus: Patia
- Species: P. orise

Binomial name
- Patia orise (Boisduval, 1836)

Synonyms
- Leptalis orise Boisduval, [1836]; Dismorphia orise; Dismorphia orise interposita Talbot, 1929

= Patia orise =

Species of butterfly

Patia orise is a butterfly in the family Pieridae. It is found from Costa Rica to Brazil and the Guyanas.

== Description ==
It is very similar to Thyridia psidii and Methona confusa, especially in the female.

The wingspan is about 80 mm (3.1 in).

== Subspecies ==
The following subspecies are recognised:

- Patia orise orise (French Guiana)
- Patia orise denigrata (Rosenberg & Talbot, 1914) (Peru, Colombia)
