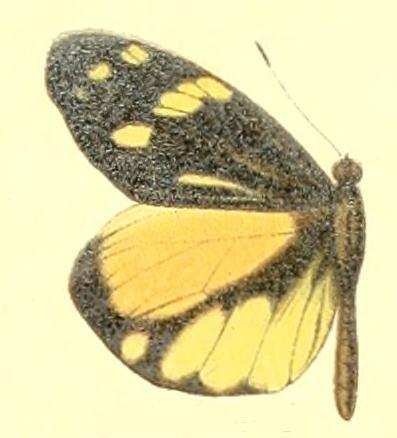
- Male
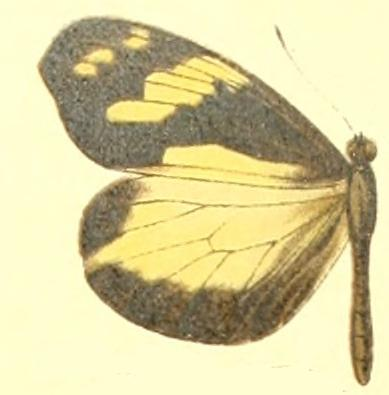
- Female

Scientific classification
- Kingdom: Animalia
- Phylum: Arthropoda
- Clade: Pancrustacea
- Class: Insecta
- Order: Lepidoptera
- Family: Pieridae
- Genus: Dismorphia
- Species: D. mirandola

Binomial name
- Dismorphia mirandola (Hewitson, 1876)

Synonyms
- Leptalis mirandola Hewitson, 1876; Dismorphia mirandola f. cauca Röber, 1909; Dismorphia mirandola ab. negrita Fassl, 1910

= Dismorphia mirandola =

Species of butterfly

Dismorphia mirandola is a butterfly in the family Pieridae. It is found in Ecuador and Colombia.

== Subspecies ==
The following subspecies are recognised:

- Dismorphia mirandola mirandola (Ecuador)
- Dismorphia mirandola discoloria Weymer, 1891 (Colombia)
