= Dismorphia lycosura =

Scientific classification
- Kingdom: Animalia
- Phylum: Arthropoda
- Clade: Pancrustacea
- Class: Insecta
- Order: Lepidoptera
- Family: Pieridae
- Genus: Dismorphia
- Species: D. lycosura

Binomial name
- Dismorphia lycosura (Hewitson, [1860])

Synonyms
- Leptalis lycosura Hewitson, [1860]; Leptalis schausii Dognin, 1891; Dismorphia lycosura ecuadorensis Niepelt, [1914]

Species of butterfly

Dismorphia lycosura is a butterfly in the family Pieridae. It is found in Ecuador and Peru.

The wingspan is about 47 mm (1.9 in).
