= Dismorphia astyocha =

Scientific classification
- Kingdom: Animalia
- Phylum: Arthropoda
- Clade: Pancrustacea
- Class: Insecta
- Order: Lepidoptera
- Family: Pieridae
- Genus: Dismorphia
- Species: D. astyocha

Binomial name
- Dismorphia astyocha Hübner, [1831]

Synonyms
- Dysmorphia astyocha Hübner, [1831]; Leptalis perrensii Gosse, 1880

Species of butterfly

Dismorphia astyocha is a butterfly in the family Pieridae. It is found in Brazil (Rio de Janeiro) and Argentina.
