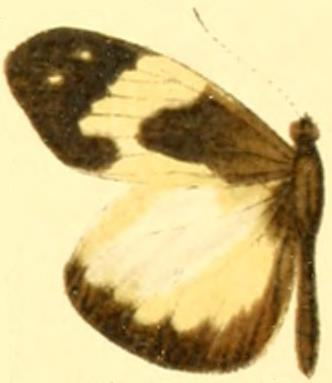
- Male D. c. crisia
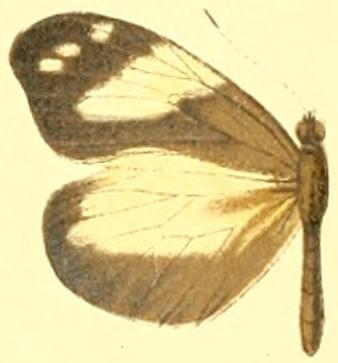
- Female

Scientific classification
- Kingdom: Animalia
- Phylum: Arthropoda
- Clade: Pancrustacea
- Class: Insecta
- Order: Lepidoptera
- Family: Pieridae
- Genus: Dismorphia
- Species: D. crisia

Binomial name
- Dismorphia crisia (Drury, [1782])

Synonyms
- Papilio crisia Drury, [1782]; Enantia critomedia Geyer, 1832; Dismorphia critomedia cereda Martin, [1923] (nom. nud.); Dismorphia rotruda Zikán, 1940; Dismorphia rotruda var. flavella Zikán, 1940; Dismorphia rotruda var. interrupta Zikán, 1940 (preocc.); Dismorphia critomedia mudana Martin, [1923] (nom. nud.); Leptalis virgo Bates, 1864; Dismorphia virgo f. candida Vázquez, 1949; Dismorphia lubina Butler, 1872; Dismorphia lunina Butler & H. Druce, 1872; Dismorphia critomedia ab. interrupta Krüger, 1929; Dismorphia foedora interrupta Zischka, 1951 (preocc.)

= Dismorphia crisia =

Species of butterfly

Dismorphia crisia, the crisia mimic white or cloud forest mimic-white, is a butterfly in the family Pieridae. The species was first described by Dru Drury in 1782. It is found from northern Central America to Bolivia and the Amazon basin.

The wingspan is 48–53 mm (1.9–2.1 in) for males and about 57 mm (2.2 in) for females. It is a very variable species.

The larvae feed on Inga and Pithecellobium species.

== Subspecies ==
The following subspecies are recognised:

- D. c. crisia (Panama, Venezuela, Colombia, Brazil: Rio de Janeiro, Rio Grande do Sul, Minas Gerais)
- D. c. foedora (Lucas, 1852) (Venezuela, Peru, Colombia)
- D. c. virgo (Bates, 1864) (Guatema, Costa Rica, Mexico)
- D. c. lubina Butler, 1872 (Costa Rica to Panama)
- D. c. tolimensis Fassl, 1915 (Colombia)
- D. c. interrupta Talbot, 1932 (Colombia)
- D. c. roraimae Hall, 1939 (Guyana)
- D. c. saltensis Breyer, 1939 (Argentina, Bolivia)
- D. c. neblina Reissinger, 1970 (Venezuela)
- D. c. alvarezi J. & R. G. Maza, 1984 (Mexico)
- D. c. steinhauseri J. & R. G. Maza, 1984 (El Salvador)
- D. c. anamaria Lamas, 2004 (Peru)
- D. c. sylvia Lamas, 2004 (Peru)

== Gallery ==
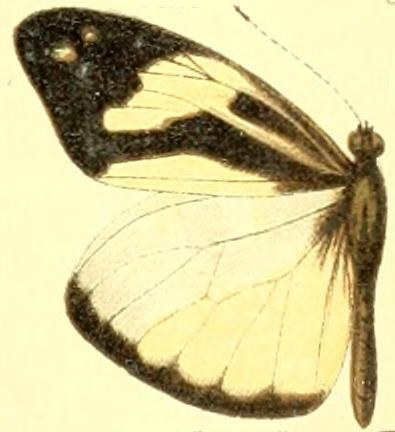
D. c. foedora male

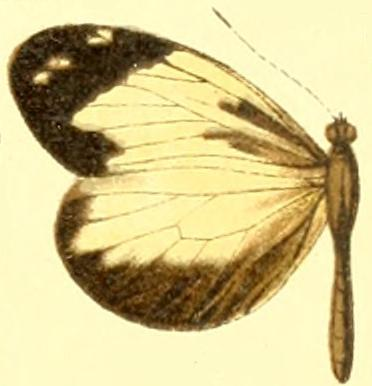
D. c. foedora female

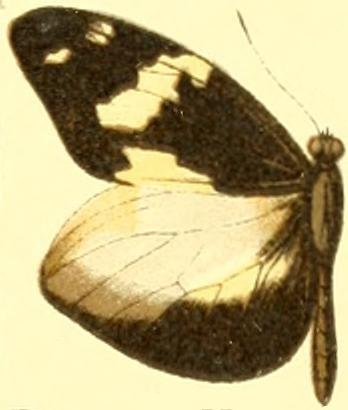
D. c. virgo male

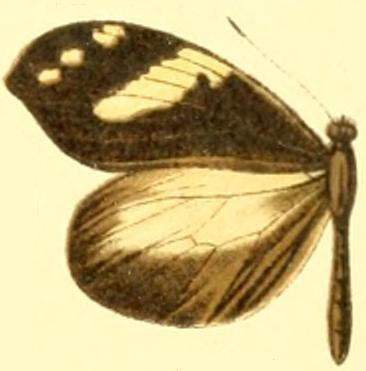
D. c. virgo female
