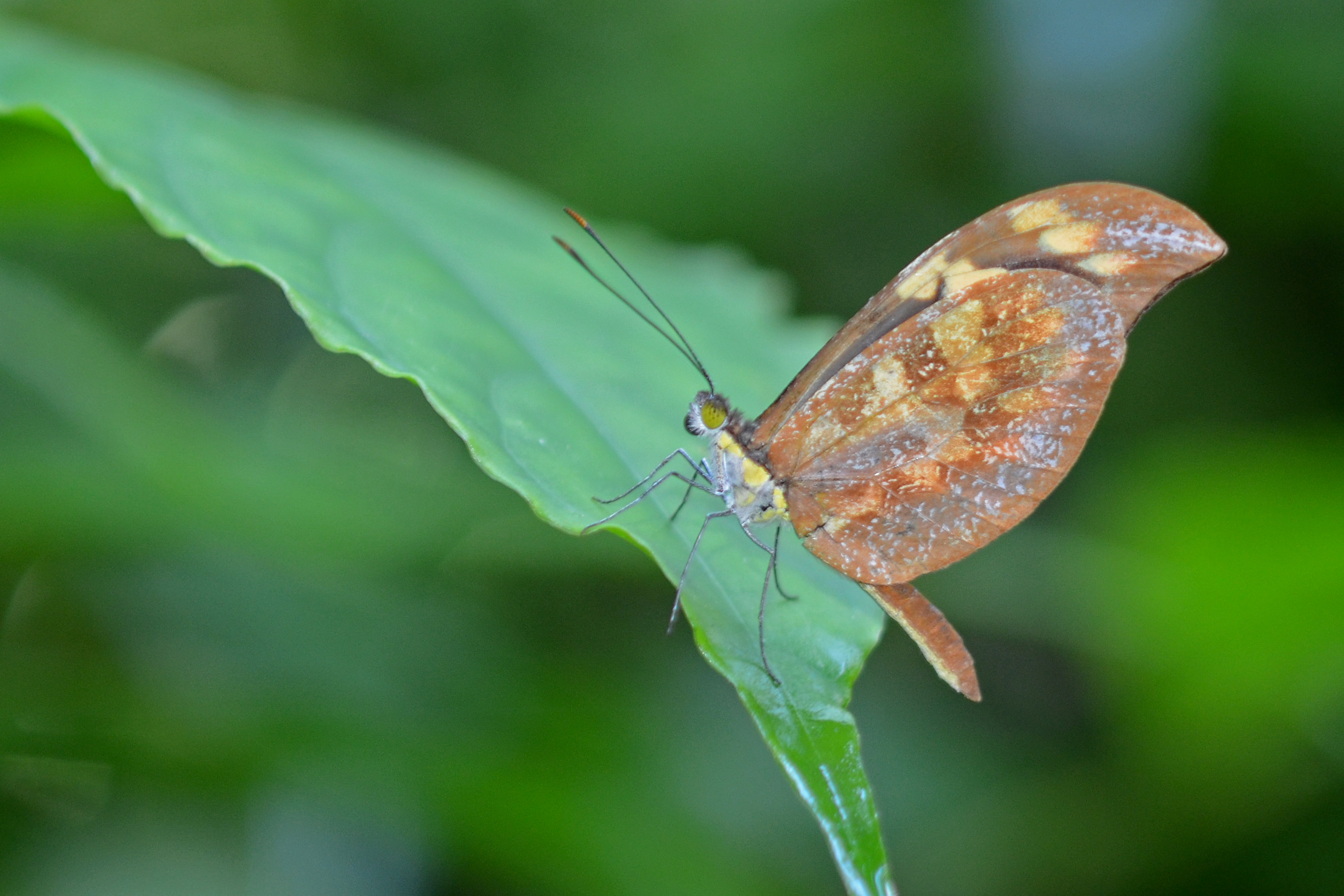
- Dismorphia spio

Scientific classification
- Kingdom: Animalia
- Phylum: Arthropoda
- Clade: Pancrustacea
- Class: Insecta
- Order: Lepidoptera
- Family: Pieridae
- Subfamily: Dismorphiinae
- Genus: Dismorphia; Hübner, 1816

Species
- See text.

Synonyms
- Acaptera Billberg, 1820; Papilio subgenus Leptalis Dalman, 1823; Hemerocharis Boisduval, 1836

= Dismorphia =

Butterfly genus in family Pieridae

Dismorphia is a genus of butterflies in the subfamily Dismorphiinae.

== List of species ==
- Dismorphia altis Fassl, 1910
- Dismorphia amphione (Cramer, 1779)
- Dismorphia arcadia (C. Felder & R. Felder, 1862)
- Dismorphia astyocha Hübner, [1831]
- Dismorphia boliviana Forster, 1955
- Dismorphia crisia (Drury, 1782)
- Dismorphia cubana (Herrich-Schäffer, 1862)
- Dismorphia eunoe (Doubleday, 1844)
- Dismorphia hyposticta (C. Felder & R. Felder, 1861)
- Dismorphia laja (Cramer, 1779)
- Dismorphia lelex (Hewitson, 1869)
- Dismorphia lewyi (Lucas, 1852)
- Dismorphia lua (Hewitson, 1869)
- Dismorphia lycosura (Hewitson, [1860])
- Dismorphia lygdamis (Hewitson, 1869)
- Dismorphia lysis (Hewitson, 1869)
- Dismorphia medora (Doubleday, 1844)
- Dismorphia medorilla (Hewitson, 1877)
- Dismorphia melia (Godart, [1824])
- Dismorphia mirandola (Hewitson, 1878)
- Dismorphia niepelti Weymer, 1909
- Dismorphia pseudolewyi Forster, 1955
- Dismorphia spio (Godart, 1819)
- Dismorphia teresa (Hewitson, 1869)
- Dismorphia thermesia (Godart, 1819)
- Dismorphia thermesina (Hopffer, 1874)
- Dismorphia theucharila (Doubleday, 1848)
- Dismorphia zaela (Hewitson, [1858])
- Dismorphia zathoe (Hewitson, [1858])
