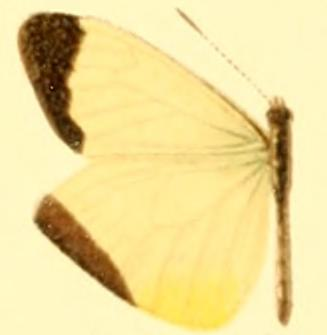
- Male
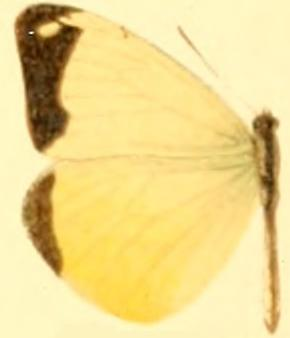
- Female

Scientific classification
- Kingdom: Animalia
- Phylum: Arthropoda
- Class: Insecta
- Order: Lepidoptera
- Family: Pieridae
- Genus: Enantia
- Species: E. limnorina

Binomial name
- Enantia limnorina (C. & R. Felder, 1865)

Synonyms
- Leptalis limnorina C. & R. Felder, 1865; Dismorphia limnorina; Dismorphia lemnorina logoja Martin, [1923] (nom. nud.); Dismorphia lemnorina marionides Martin, [1923] (nom. nud.); Dismorphia dissimulata d'Almeida, 1931; Dismorphia aenigma d'Almeida, 1931; Dismorphia aeigma; Dismorphia limnorina hoffmanni d'Almeida, 1934

= Enantia limnorina =

Species of butterfly

Enantia limnorina is a butterfly in the family Pieridae. It is found in Brazil (Santa Catarina, Rio Grande do Sul, Rio de Janeiro). The species was first described in 1865 by C. & R. Felder as Leptalis limnorina.
