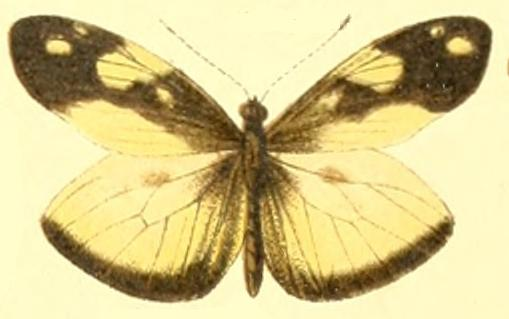
- Dismorphia thermesina pimpla

Scientific classification
- Kingdom: Animalia
- Phylum: Arthropoda
- Clade: Pancrustacea
- Class: Insecta
- Order: Lepidoptera
- Family: Pieridae
- Genus: Dismorphia
- Species: D. thermesina

Binomial name
- Dismorphia thermesina (Hopffer, 1874)

Synonyms
- Leptalis thermesina Hopffer, 1874; Leptalis thermesina Hopffer, 1879; Leptalis pimpla Hopffer, 1874

= Dismorphia thermesina =

Species of butterfly

Dismorphia thermesina is a butterfly in the family Pieridae. It is found in Peru and Bolivia.

== Subspecies ==
The following subspecies are recognised:

- Dismorphia thermesina thermesina (Peru)
- Dismorphia thermesina pimpla (Hopffer, 1874) (Bolivia)
