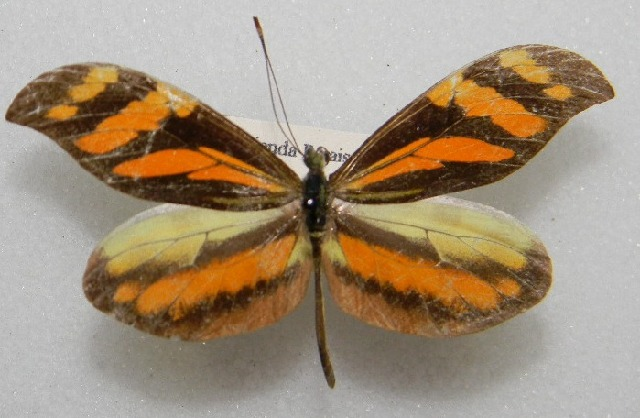
- Male
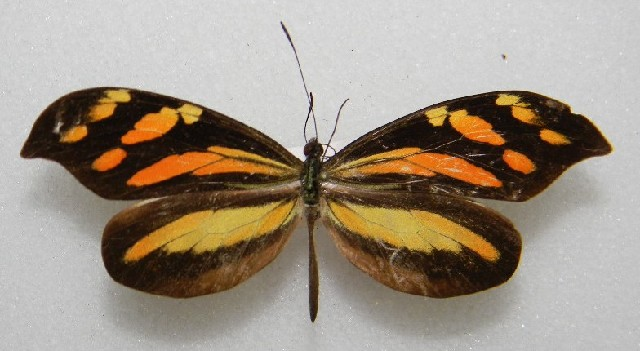
- Female

Scientific classification
- Kingdom: Animalia
- Phylum: Arthropoda
- Clade: Pancrustacea
- Class: Insecta
- Order: Lepidoptera
- Family: Pieridae
- Genus: Dismorphia
- Species: D. spio

Binomial name
- Dismorphia spio (Godart, 1824)

Synonyms
- Pieris spio Godart, [1824]

= Dismorphia spio =

Species of butterfly

Dismorphia spio, the Hispaniolan mimic-white or Haitian mimic, is a species of butterfly of the family Pieridae. It is found on Hispaniola and in Puerto Rico.

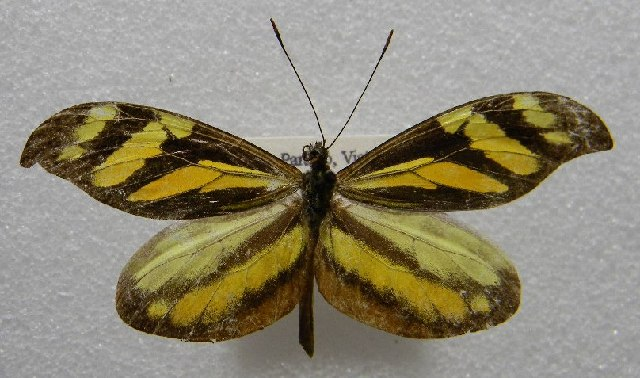
Male of the yellow form

This species mimics Heliconius charitonius.

The wingspan is 50–60 mm.
