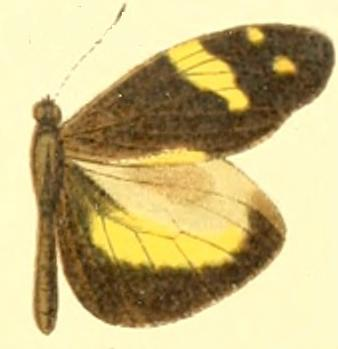
- Male
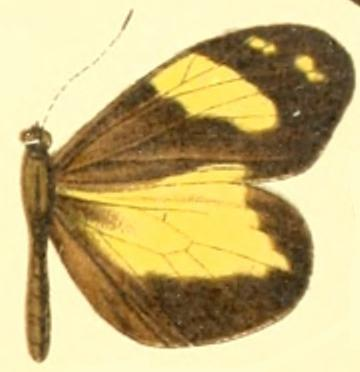
- Female

Scientific classification
- Kingdom: Animalia
- Phylum: Arthropoda
- Clade: Pancrustacea
- Class: Insecta
- Order: Lepidoptera
- Family: Pieridae
- Genus: Dismorphia
- Species: D. medora

Binomial name
- Dismorphia medora (Doubleday, 1844)

Synonyms
- Leptalis medora Doubleday, 1844; Leptalis casta Kollar, 1850

= Dismorphia medora =

Medora mimic white

Species of butterfly

Dismorphia medora, the Medora mimic white is a butterfly in the family Pieridae. It is found in Colombia, Ecuador and Peru.

The wingspan is about 38 mm (1.5 in).

== Subspecies ==
The following subspecies are recognised:

- Dismorphia medora medora (Colombia)
- Dismorphia medora lilianna Lamas, 2004 (Ecuador)
- Dismorphia medora juditha Lamas, 2004 (Peru)
