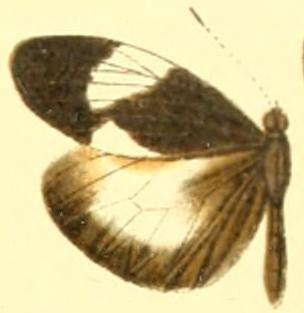
- Male
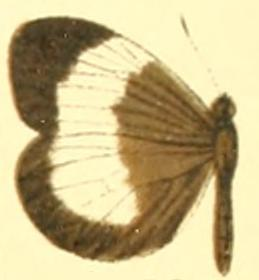
- Female

Scientific classification
- Kingdom: Animalia
- Phylum: Arthropoda
- Clade: Pancrustacea
- Class: Insecta
- Order: Lepidoptera
- Family: Pieridae
- Genus: Dismorphia
- Species: D. lysis

Binomial name
- Dismorphia lysis (Hewitson, 1869)

Synonyms
- Leptalis lysis Hewitson, 1869

= Dismorphia lysis =

Species of butterfly

Dismorphia lysis, the dainty egg white or Lysis mimic white, is a butterfly in the family Pieridae. It is found from Ecuador to southern Peru. The habitat consists of cloud forests.

The wingspan is about 40 mm (1.6 in). Adults have long narrow almost elliptical forewings and large hindwings. The underside is white, mottled in grey and yellow.

== Subspecies ==
The following subspecies are recognised:

- Dismorphia lysis lysis (Ecuador)
- Dismorphia lysis peruana Röber, 1909 (Peru)
- Dismorphia lysis mariella Lamas, 2004 (Peru)
