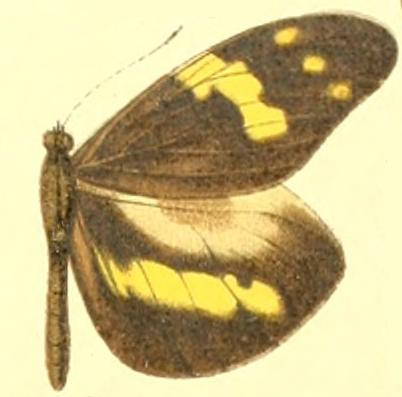
- Male
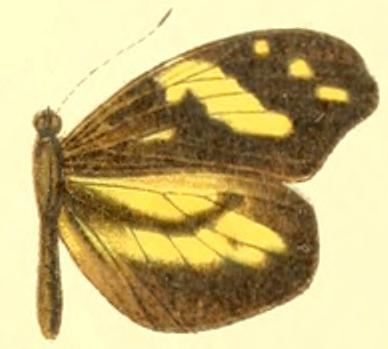
- Female

Scientific classification
- Kingdom: Animalia
- Phylum: Arthropoda
- Clade: Pancrustacea
- Class: Insecta
- Order: Lepidoptera
- Family: Pieridae
- Genus: Dismorphia
- Species: D. arcadia

Binomial name
- Dismorphia arcadia (C. & R. Felder, 1862)

Synonyms
- Leptalis arcadia C. & R. Felder, 1862; Leptalis idonia Hewitson, 1869; Dismorphia arcadia ab. melanoptera Apolinar, 1926; Leptalis medorina Hewitson, 1875

= Dismorphia arcadia =

Species of butterfly

Dismorphia arcadia is a butterfly in the family Pieridae. It is found from Colombia to Bolivia.

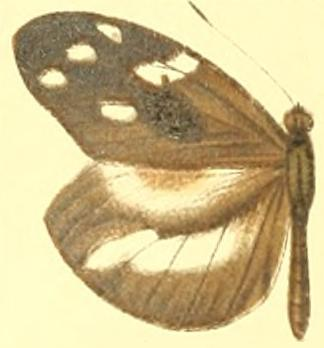
Dismorphia arcadia hippotas

The wingspan is about 50 mm (2.0 in).

== Subspecies ==
The following subspecies are recognised:

- Dismorphia arcadia arcadia (Colombia)
- Dismorphia arcadia hippotas (Hewitson, 1875) (Ecuador)
- Dismorphia arcadia medorina Hewitson, 1875 (Bolivia)
- Dismorphia arcadia lucilla Butler, 1899 (Ecuador)
- Dismorphia arcadia heloisa Lamas, 2004 (Peru)
