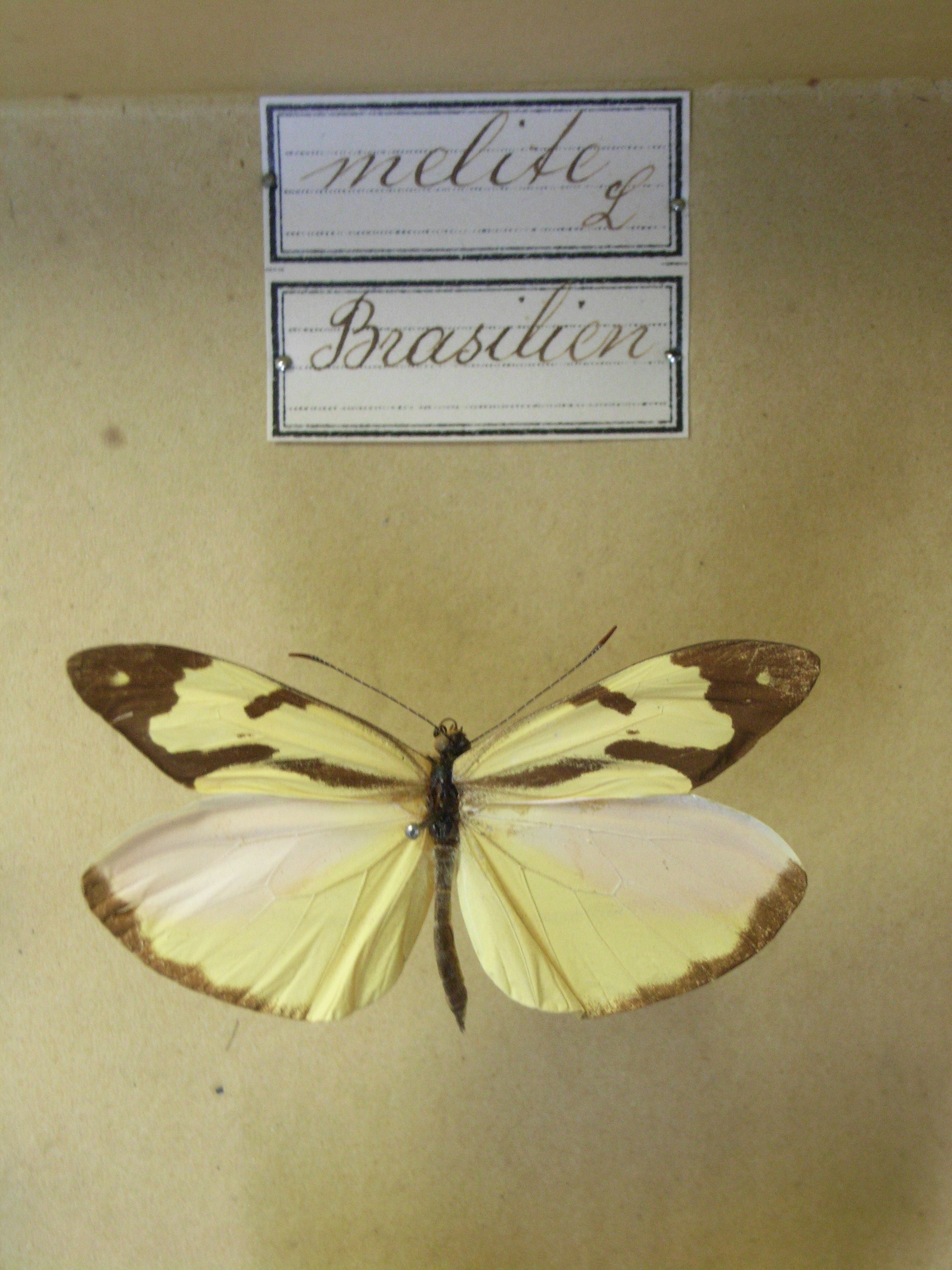
- Enantia melite

Scientific classification
- Kingdom: Animalia
- Phylum: Arthropoda
- Class: Insecta
- Order: Lepidoptera
- Family: Pieridae
- Subfamily: Dismorphiinae
- Genus: Enantia; Hübner, 1819

Species
- See text

Synonyms
- Licinia Swainson, 1820

= Enantia =

Butterfly genus in family Pieridae

Enantia is a genus of butterflies in the subfamily Dismorphiinae. They are native to the Americas.

== Species ==
- Enantia albania (H.W. Bates, 1864) – costa-spotted mimic-white
- Enantia aloikea Brévignon, 1993
- Enantia citrinella (C. Felder & R. Felder, 1861)
- Enantia clarissa (Weymer, 1895)
- Enantia jethys (Boisduval, 1836) – jethys mimic-white
- Enantia limnorina (C. Felder & R. Felder, 1865)
- Enantia lina (Herbst, 1792) – white mimic-white
- Enantia mazai Llorente, 1984 – De la Maza's mimic-white
- Enantia melite (Linnaeus, 1763)
