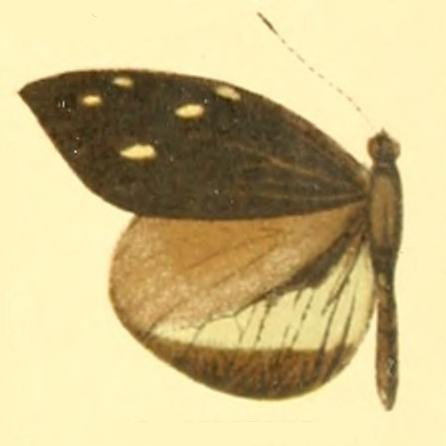

Scientific classification
- Domain: Eukaryota
- Kingdom: Animalia
- Phylum: Arthropoda
- Class: Insecta
- Order: Lepidoptera
- Family: Pieridae
- Genus: Lieinix
- Species: L. cinerascens

Binomial name
- Lieinix cinerascens (Salvin, 1871)

Synonyms
- Leptalis cinerascens Salvin, 1871; Acmepteron cinerascens; Acmepteron poasina Schaus, 1913

= Lieinix cinerascens =

Bluish mimic-white

Species of butterfly

Lieinix cinerascens, the bluish mimic-white, is a butterfly in the family Pieridae. It is found in Costa Rica and Panama.
