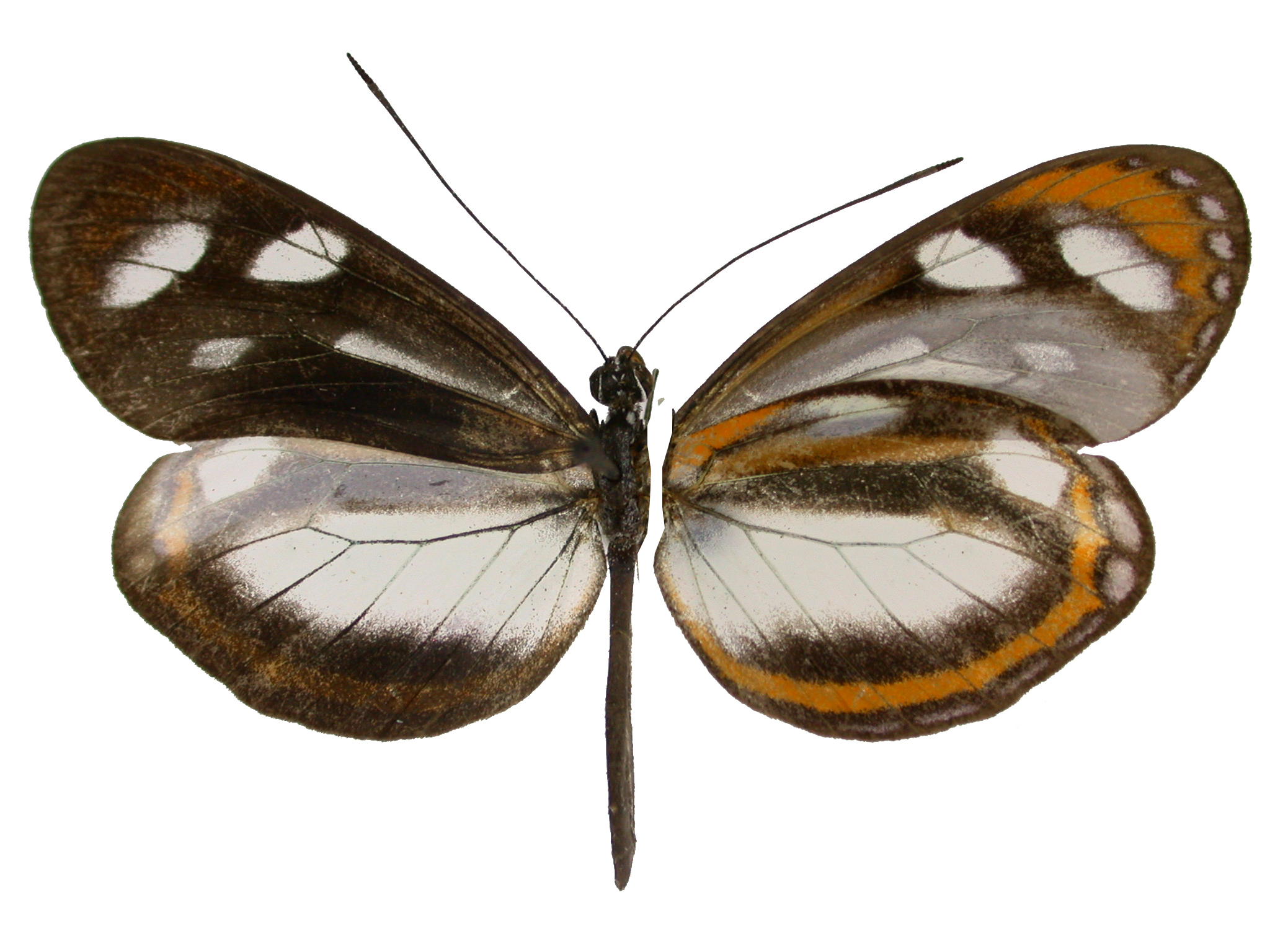

Scientific classification
- Kingdom: Animalia
- Phylum: Arthropoda
- Clade: Pancrustacea
- Class: Insecta
- Order: Lepidoptera
- Family: Pieridae
- Genus: Dismorphia
- Species: D. theucharila

Binomial name
- Dismorphia theucharila (Doubleday, 1848)

Synonyms
- Leptalis theucharila Doubleday, 1848; Dismorphia flammula Butler, 1899; Dismorphia fervida Butler, 1899; Dismorphia batesi Röber, 1909; Dismorphia lysandra Avinoff, 1926; Dismorphia yurupari Zikán, 1940; Dismorphia massai Zikán, 1941; Dismorphia godoleva Zikán, 1941; Leptalis fortunata Lucas, 1854; Leptalis antherize Hewitson, [1858]; Leptalis ribbei Godman & Salvin, 1878; Dismorphia alterata Butler, 1899; Dismorphia nella Butler, 1896; Dismorphia staudingeri Forster, 1955; Leptalis erythroe Bates, 1861; Leptalis melanoe Bates, 1861; Dismorphia pellucida Röber, 1924; Dismorphia leuconia Butler, 1899; Dismorphia limonea Butler, 1899; Dismorphia columbiana Hering, 1925; Dismorphia leuconoe melanina Avinoff, 1926

= Dismorphia theucharila =

Clearwinged mimic white

Species of butterfly

Dismorphia theucharila, the clearwinged mimic white, is a species of butterfly of the family Pieridae. It is found from Mexico to Bolivia and the Guianas.

The wingspan is 25–27 mm. It exhibits sexual dimorphism.

== Subspecies ==
- D. t. theucharila (Venezuela)
- D. t. lysinoe (Hewitson, [1853]) (Brazil (Amazonas))
- D. t. theonoe (Hewitson, [1853]) (Brazil (Pará), Ecuador)
- D. t. fortunata (Lucas, 1854) (Mexico, Panama)
- D. t. siloe (Hewitson, [1858]) (Colombia)
- D. t. argochloe (Bates, 1861) (Brazil (Amazonas), Bolivia)
- D. t. leuconoe (Bates, 1861) (Brazil (Amazonas), Ecuador, Colombia)
- D. t. avonia (Hewitson, 1867) (Ecuador, Colombia)
- D. t. lysinoides Staudinger, 1884 (Colombia)
- D. t. xanthone Röber, 1924 (Colombia)
- D. t. vitrea Krüger, 1925 (Surinam, French Guiana)
- D. t. elisa Lamas, 2004 (Peru)

== Gallery ==
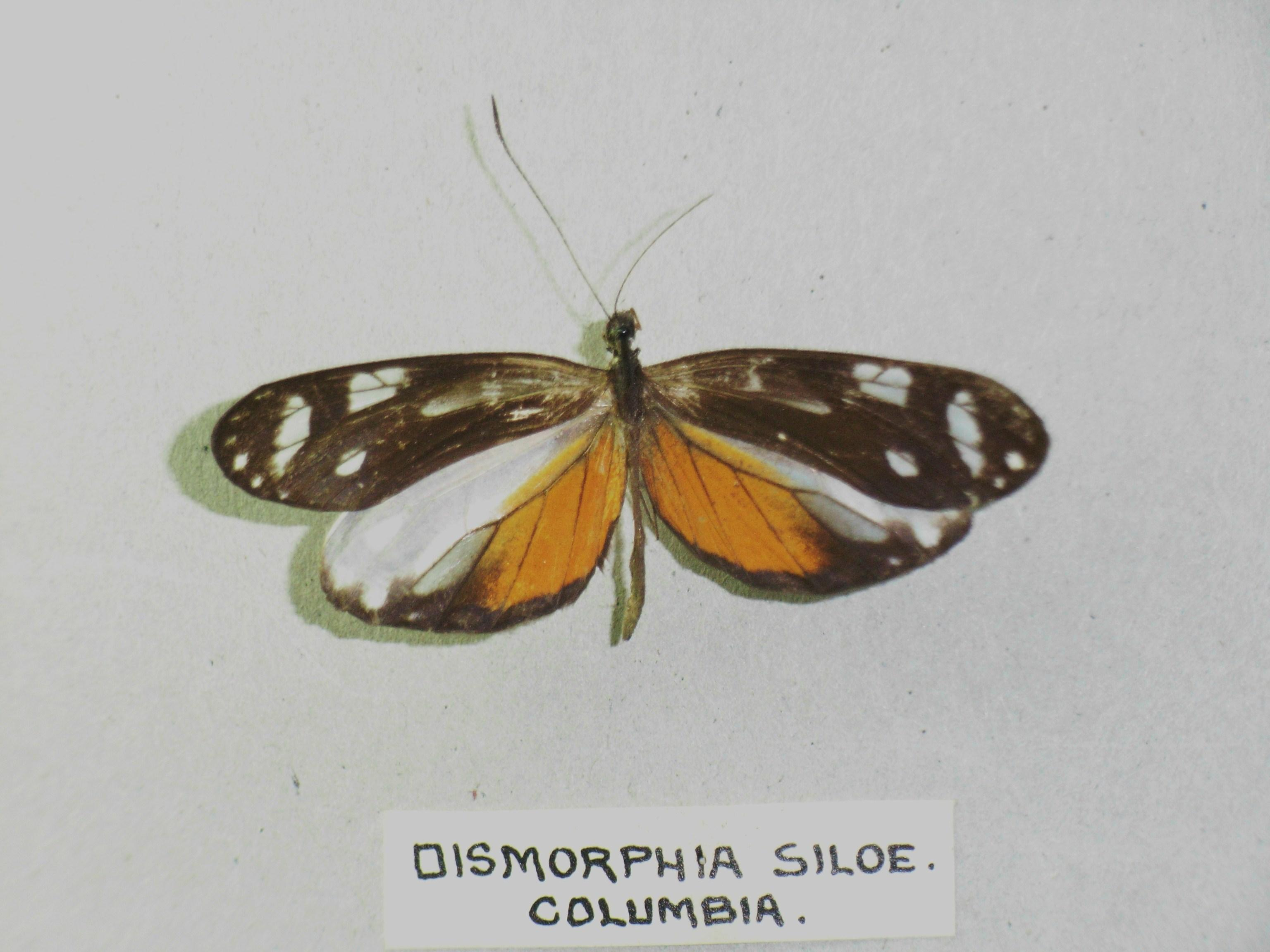
D. t. siloe

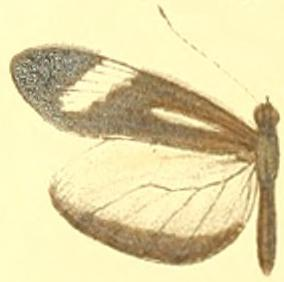
D. t. avonia male

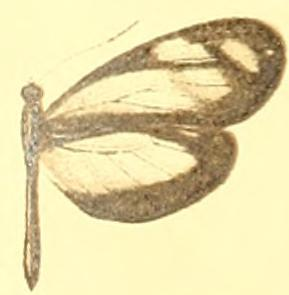
D. t. avonia female

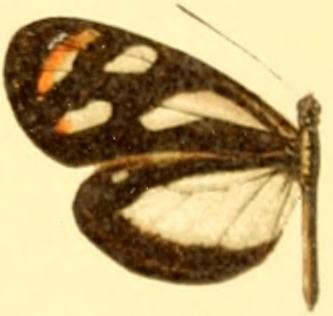
D. t. leuconoe male

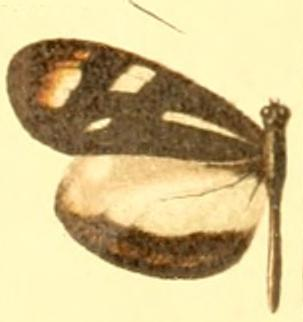
D. t. leuconoe female

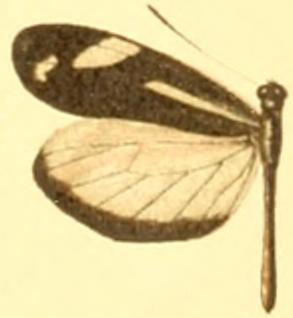
D. t. fortunata male

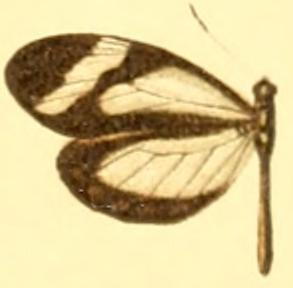
D. t. fortunata female

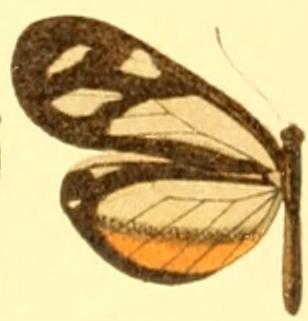
D. t. lysinoides

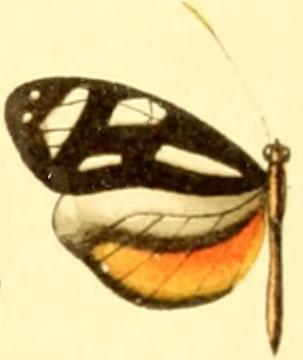
D. t. lysinoe

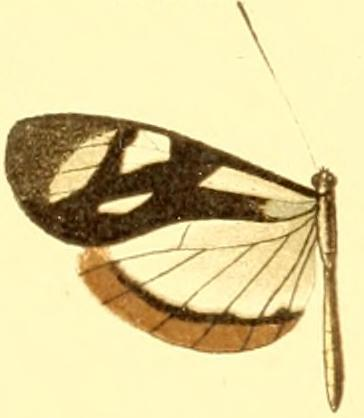
D. t. theonoe
