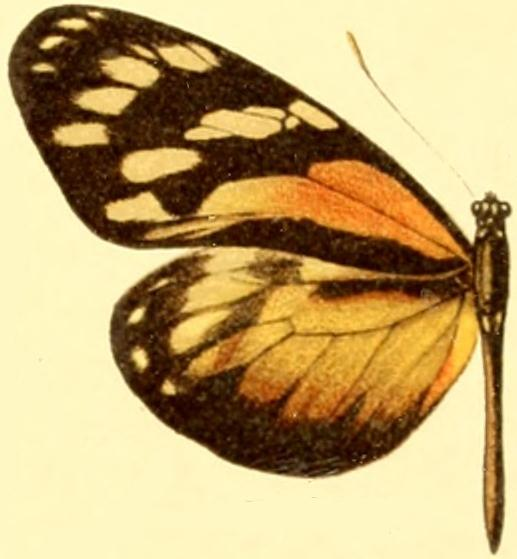
- Patia from The Macrolepidoptera of the World. Vol. 5

Scientific classification
- Domain: Eukaryota
- Kingdom: Animalia
- Phylum: Arthropoda
- Class: Insecta
- Order: Lepidoptera
- Family: Pieridae
- Subfamily: Dismorphiinae
- Genus: Patia; Klots, 1933

Species
- See text

= Patia =

Butterfly genus in family Pieridae

Patia is a genus of butterflies in the subfamily Dismorphiinae. They are native to the Americas.

== Species ==
- Patia cordillera (C. Felder & R. Felder, 1862)
- Patia orise (Boisduval, 1836)
- Patia rhetes (Hewitson, [1857])
