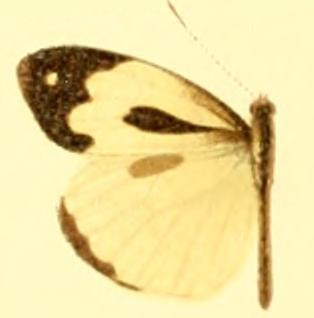
- Male
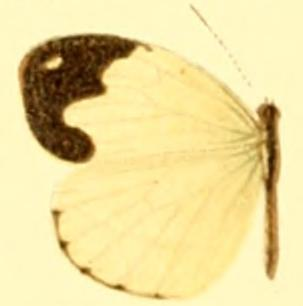
- Female

Scientific classification
- Kingdom: Animalia
- Phylum: Arthropoda
- Clade: Pancrustacea
- Class: Insecta
- Order: Lepidoptera
- Family: Pieridae
- Genus: Dismorphia
- Species: D. thermesia

Binomial name
- Dismorphia thermesia (Godart, 1819)

Synonyms
- Pieris thermesia Godart, 1819

= Dismorphia thermesia =

Pretty mimic white

Species of butterfly

Dismorphia thermesia, the pretty mimic white, is a butterfly in the family Pieridae. It is found in Guyana, Brazil, Ecuador, Peru, and western Bolivia. The habitat consists of transitional rainforests and cloudforests.

The wingspan is about 50–57 mm (2.0–2.2 in)
