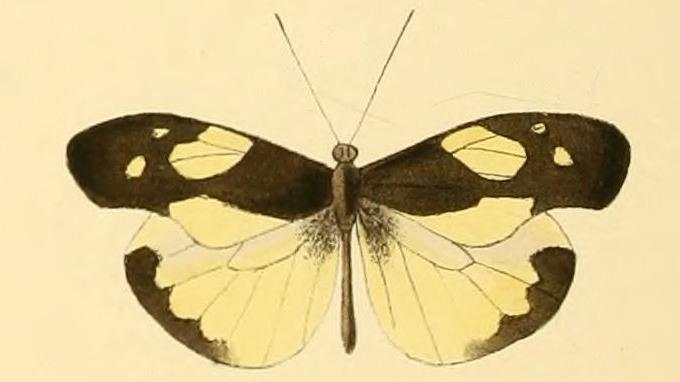

Scientific classification
- Kingdom: Animalia
- Phylum: Arthropoda
- Clade: Pancrustacea
- Class: Insecta
- Order: Lepidoptera
- Family: Pieridae
- Genus: Dismorphia
- Species: D. lelex

Binomial name
- Dismorphia lelex (Hewitson, 1869)

Synonyms
- Leptalis lelex Hewitson, 1869; Dismorphia werneri Hering, 1926

= Dismorphia lelex =

Lelex mimic white

Species of butterfly

Dismorphia lelex, the lelex mimic white, is a butterfly in the family Pieridae. It is found in Ecuador and Colombia.

The wingspan is about 45 mm (1.8 in) for males and 42 mm (1.7 in) for females.

== Subspecies ==
The following subspecies are recognised:

- Dismorphia lelex lelex (Ecuador, Colombia)
- Dismorphia lelex xiomara Lamas, 2004 (Ecuador)
