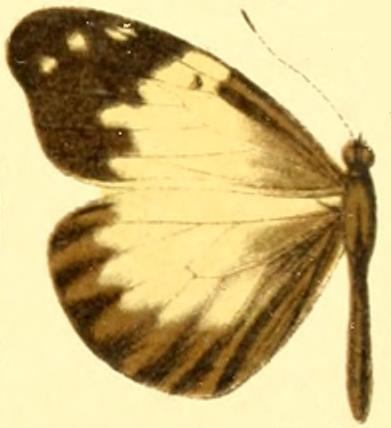
- Female
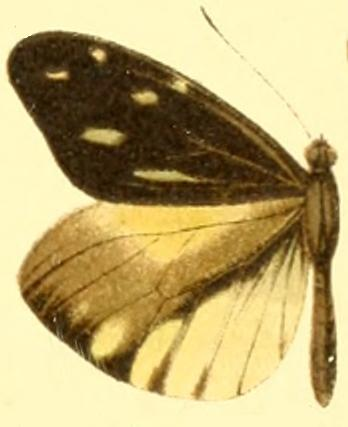
- Male

Scientific classification
- Kingdom: Animalia
- Phylum: Arthropoda
- Clade: Pancrustacea
- Class: Insecta
- Order: Lepidoptera
- Family: Pieridae
- Genus: Dismorphia
- Species: D. lewyi

Binomial name
- Dismorphia lewyi (H. Lucas, 1852)

Synonyms
- Leptalis lewyi H. Lucas, 1852; Leptalis kadenii C. Felder & R. Felder, 1861; Dismorphia macasana Strand, 1912

= Dismorphia lewyi =

Species of butterfly

Dismorphia lewyi is a butterfly in the family Pieridae first described by Hippolyte Lucas in 1852. It is found from Venezuela to Bolivia.

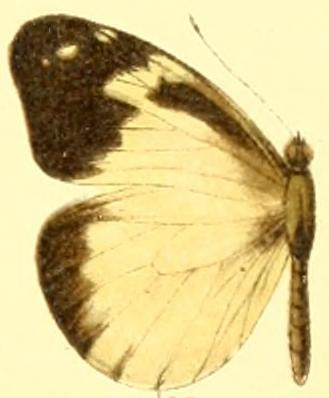
Female

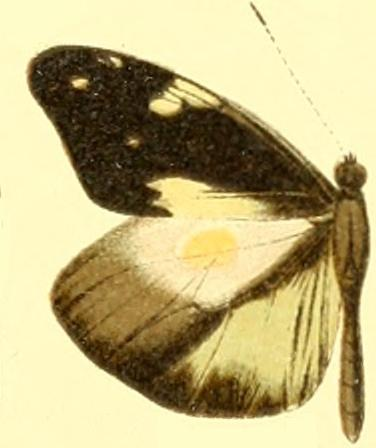
Male

The wingspan is 48–50 mm (1.9–2.0 in).

== Subspecies ==
The following subspecies are recognised:

- Dismorphia lewyi lewyi (Colombia)
- Dismorphia lewyi nasua (C. Felder & R. Felder, 1861) (Venezuela)
- Dismorphia lewyi leonora (Hewitson, 1869) (Ecuador)
- Dismorphia lewyi boliviensis Röber, 1909 (Bolivia)
- Dismorphia lewyi dolorita Fassl, 1910 (Colombia)
- Dismorphia lewyi rebecca Lamas, 2004 (Peru)
