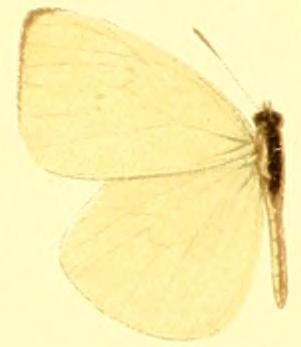
- Pseudopieris nehemia nehemia
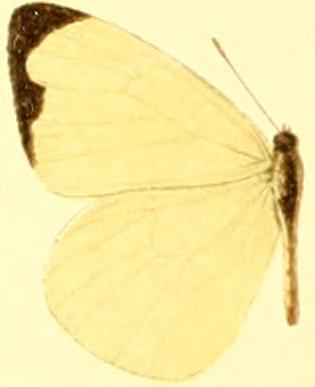
- Pseudopieris nehemia aequatorialis

Scientific classification
- Domain: Eukaryota
- Kingdom: Animalia
- Phylum: Arthropoda
- Class: Insecta
- Order: Lepidoptera
- Family: Pieridae
- Genus: Pseudopieris
- Species: P. nehemia

Binomial name
- Pseudopieris nehemia (Boisduval, 1836)

Synonyms
- Pieris nehemia Boisduval, 1836; Dismorphia nehemia; Leptalis cydno Doubleday, 1842; Leptalis penia Hopffer, 1874

= Pseudopieris nehemia =

Clean mimic-white

Species of butterfly

Pseudopieris nehemia, the clean mimic-white, is a butterfly in the family Pieridae. It is found from Mexico to Brazil and Argentina. The habitat consists of rainforests and transitional cloudforests.

The wingspan is 42–44 mm (1.7–1.7 in).

== Subspecies ==
The following subspecies are recognised:

- Pseudopieris nehemia nehemia (Brazil)
- Pseudopieris nehemia aequatorialis (C. & R. Felder, 1861) (Bolivia, Peru)
- Pseudopieris nehemia limbalis Röber, 1924 (Brazil: Pará)
- Pseudopieris nehemia prasina Hayward, 1949 (Argentina)
- Pseudopieris nehemia francisca Lamas, 1979 (Honduras)
- Pseudopieris nehemia irma Lamas, 1979 (Guatemala)
- Pseudopieris nehemia luisa Lamas, 1979 (Panama)
- Pseudopieris nehemia melania Lamas, 1985 (Peru)
- Pseudopieris nehemia jessica Lamas, 2004 (Peru)
- Pseudopieris nehemia mariana Lamas, 2004 (Peru)
