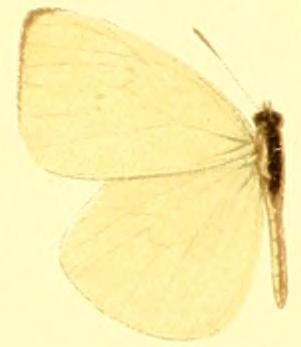
- Pseudopieris nehemia from The Macrolepidoptera of the World. Vol. 5: Pseudopieris nehemia

Scientific classification
- Domain: Eukaryota
- Kingdom: Animalia
- Phylum: Arthropoda
- Class: Insecta
- Order: Lepidoptera
- Family: Pieridae
- Subfamily: Dismorphiinae
- Genus: Pseudopieris; Godman & Salvin, 1889

Species
- See text

= Pseudopieris =

Butterfly genus in family Pieridae

Pseudopieris is a genus of butterflies in the subfamily Dismorphiinae. They are native to the Americas.

== Species ==
- Pseudopieris nehemia (Boisduval, 1836) – clean mimic-white
- Pseudopieris viridula (C. Felder & R. Felder, 1861)
