= Inga mortoniana =

Conservation status
- Least Concern (IUCN 3.1)

Scientific classification
- Kingdom: Plantae
- Clade: Embryophytes
- Clade: Tracheophytes
- Clade: Spermatophytes
- Clade: Angiosperms
- Clade: Eudicots
- Clade: Rosids
- Order: Fabales
- Family: Fabaceae
- Subfamily: Caesalpinioideae
- Clade: Mimosoid clade
- Genus: Inga
- Species: I. mortoniana

Binomial name
- Inga mortoniana J.León

Species of legume

Inga mortoniana is a species of plant in the family Fabaceae. It is a tree native to Colombia, Costa Rica, Honduras, and Panama. It grows in montane and cloud rain forests up to 1,750 metres elevation, in the Talamancan montane forests, Northwestern Andean montane forests, Isthmian–Atlantic moist forests, and Costa Rican seasonal moist forests ecoregions.
