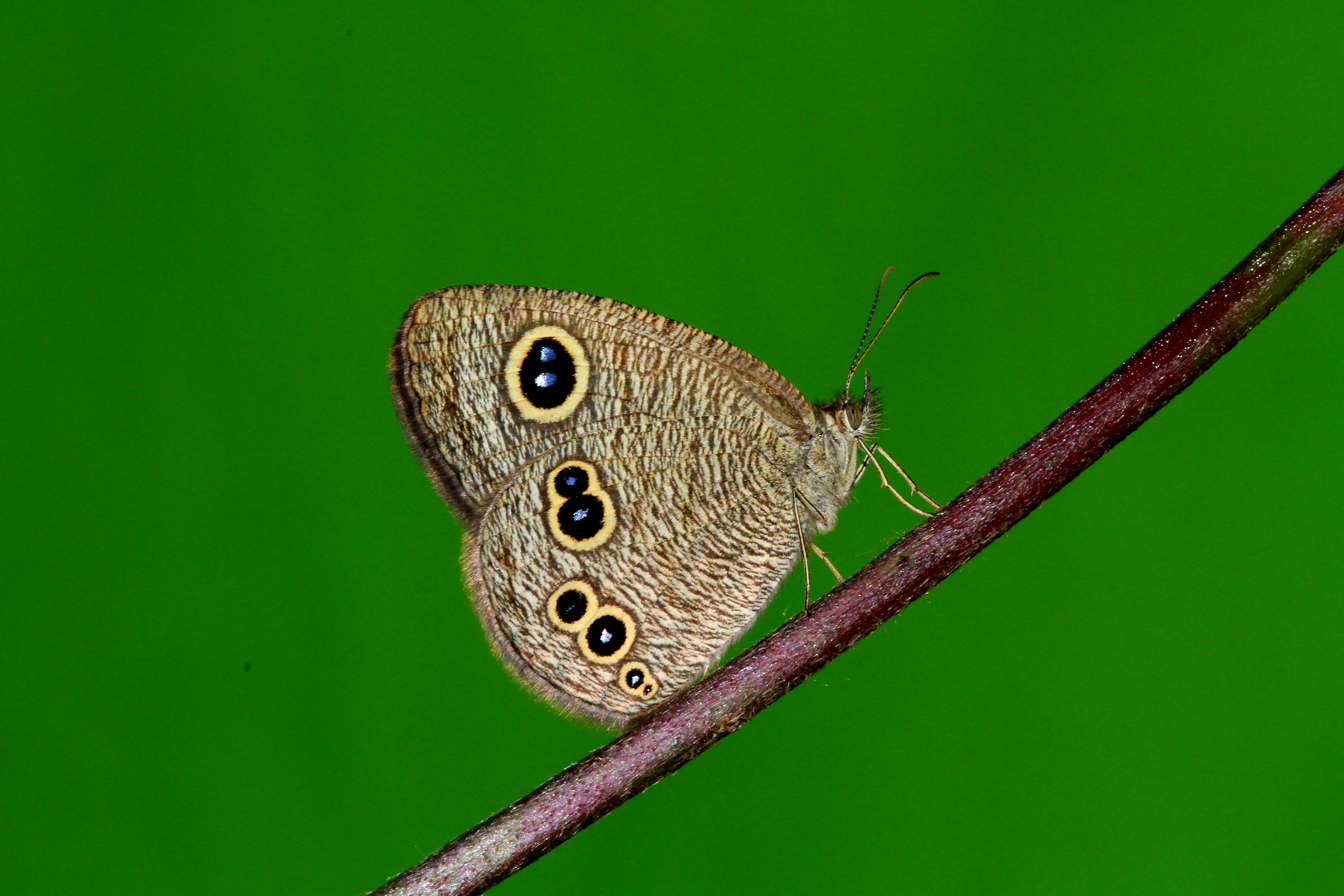

Scientific classification
- Kingdom: Animalia
- Phylum: Arthropoda
- Class: Insecta
- Order: Lepidoptera
- Family: Nymphalidae
- Genus: Ypthima
- Species: Y. tabella

Binomial name
- Ypthima tabella Marshall & de Nicéville, 1883
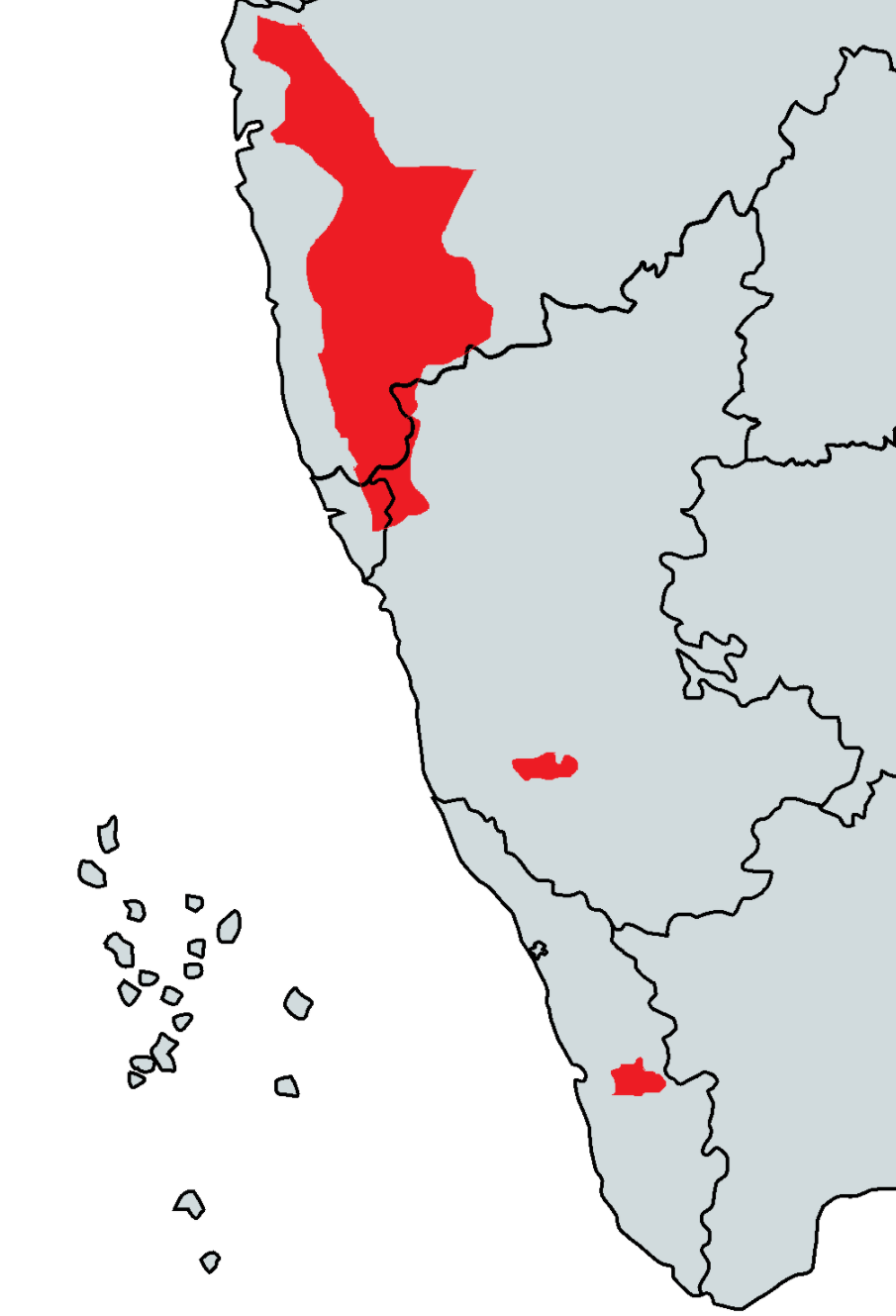

= Ypthima tabella =

Species of butterfly

Ypthima tabella is a species of Satyrinae butterfly found in South India, described by Marshall and De Nicéville in 1883. Some experts still consider this as a subspecies of Ypthima philomela, baby fivering.

== Description ==
The upper side of the male is brown, uniform in color. Fore-wing has a bipupilled ocellus. Hind-wing has two submarginal ocelli between the median nervules. The underside is pale brown. Fore-wing has one ocellus. Hind-wing has six ocelli, placed in pairs. No sexual patch on fore-wing on upper-side.

It can be distinguished from Ypthima philomela by the absence of sexual mark in the male.

Life cycle

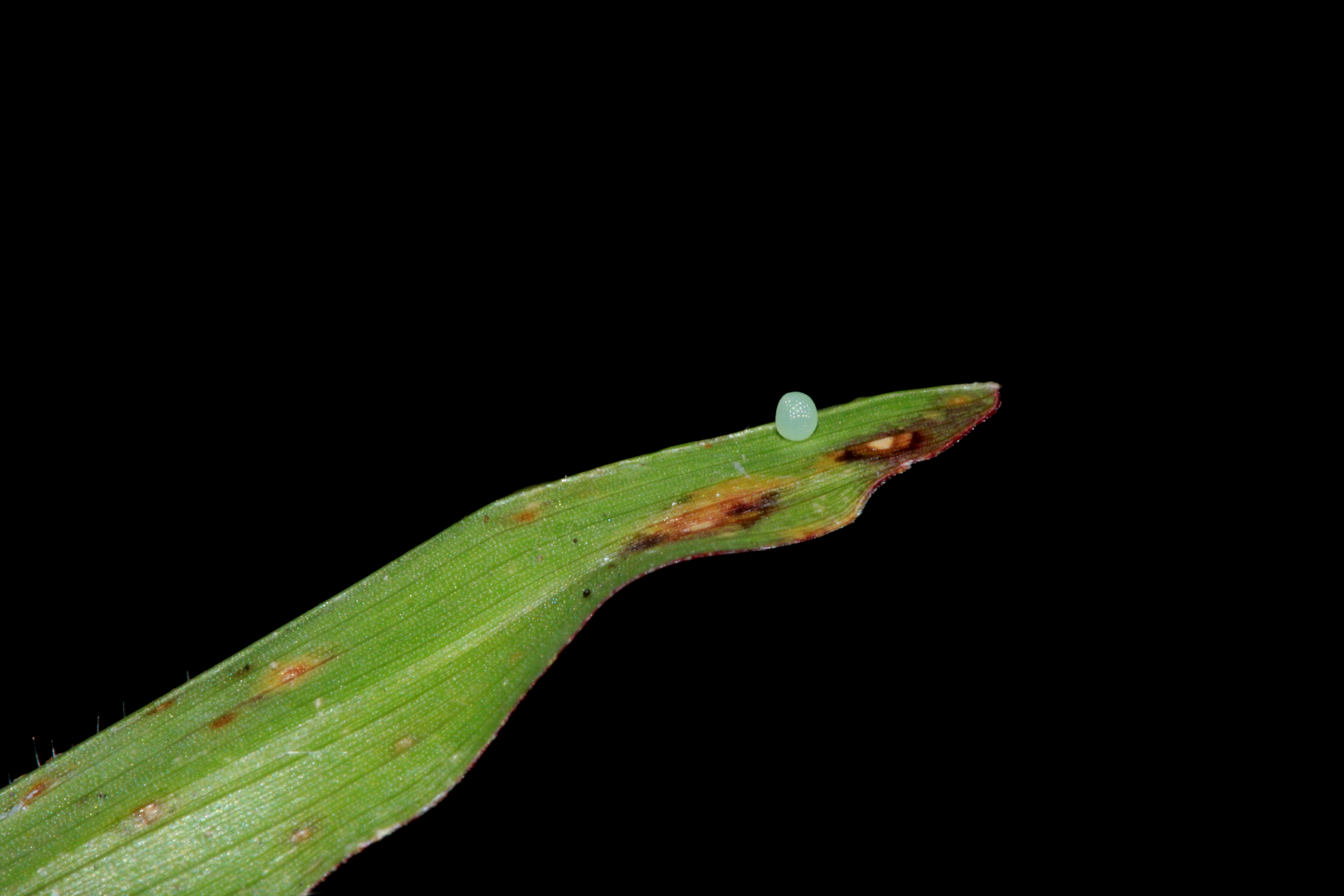
Egg

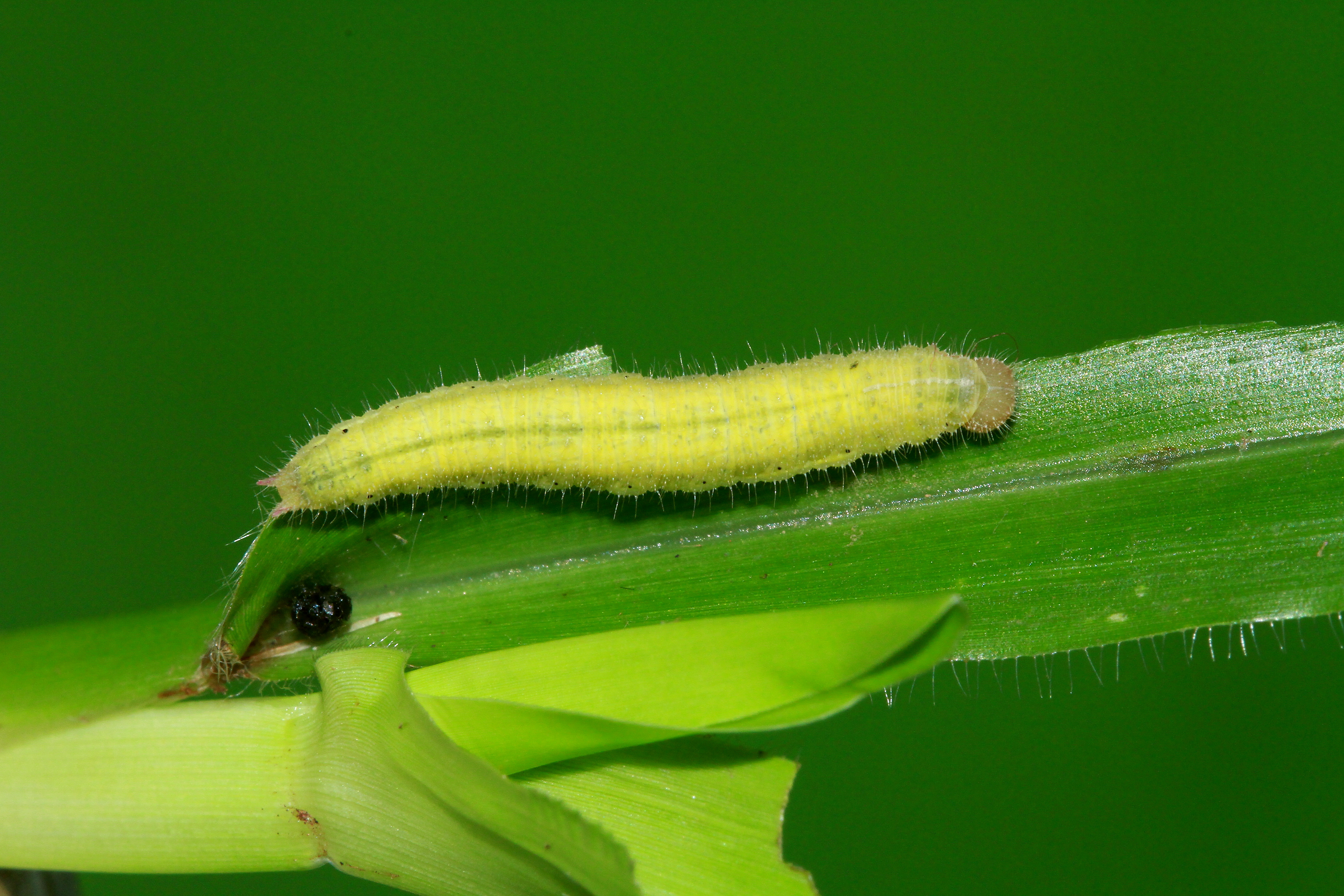
Larva

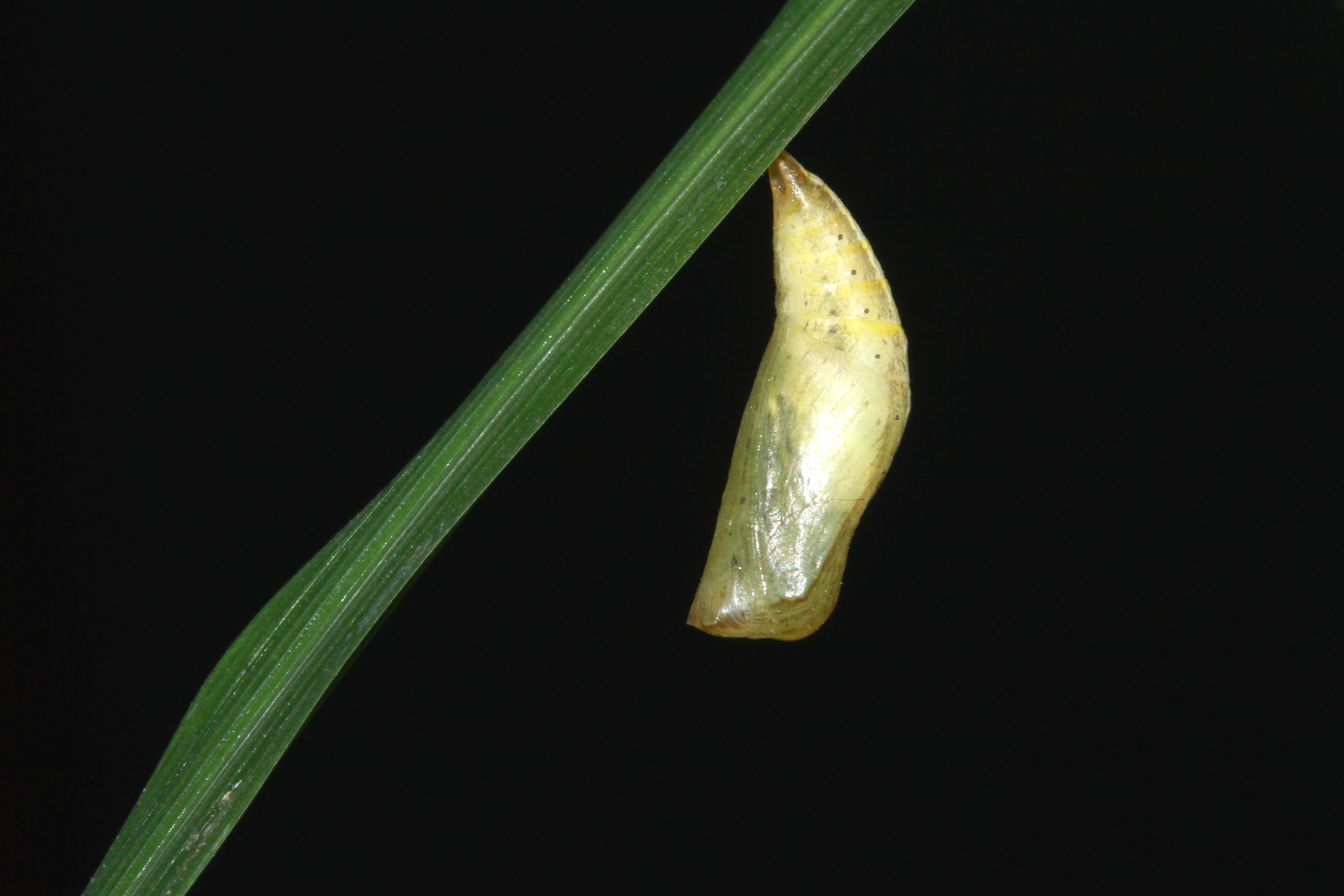
Chrysalis

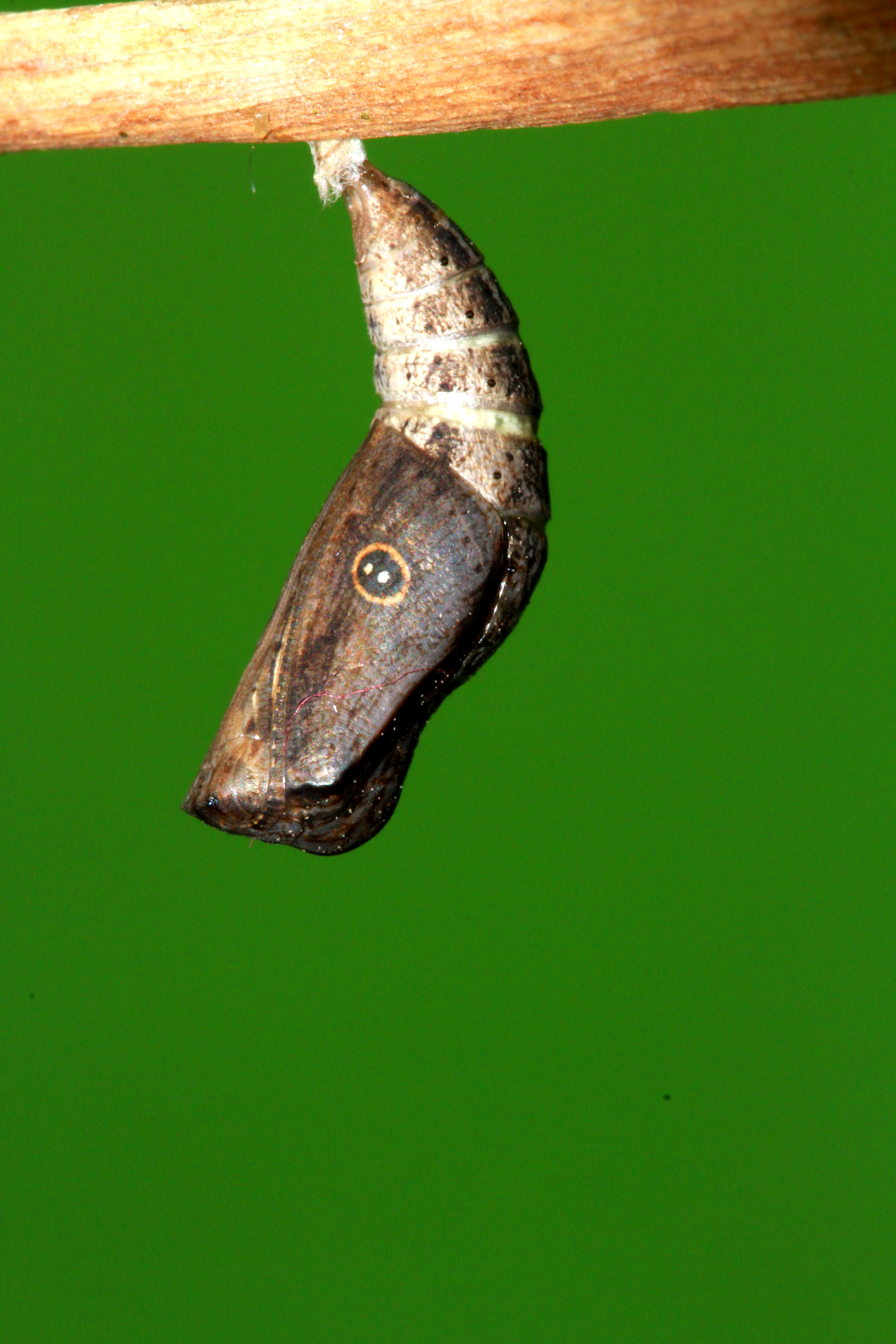
Chrysalis

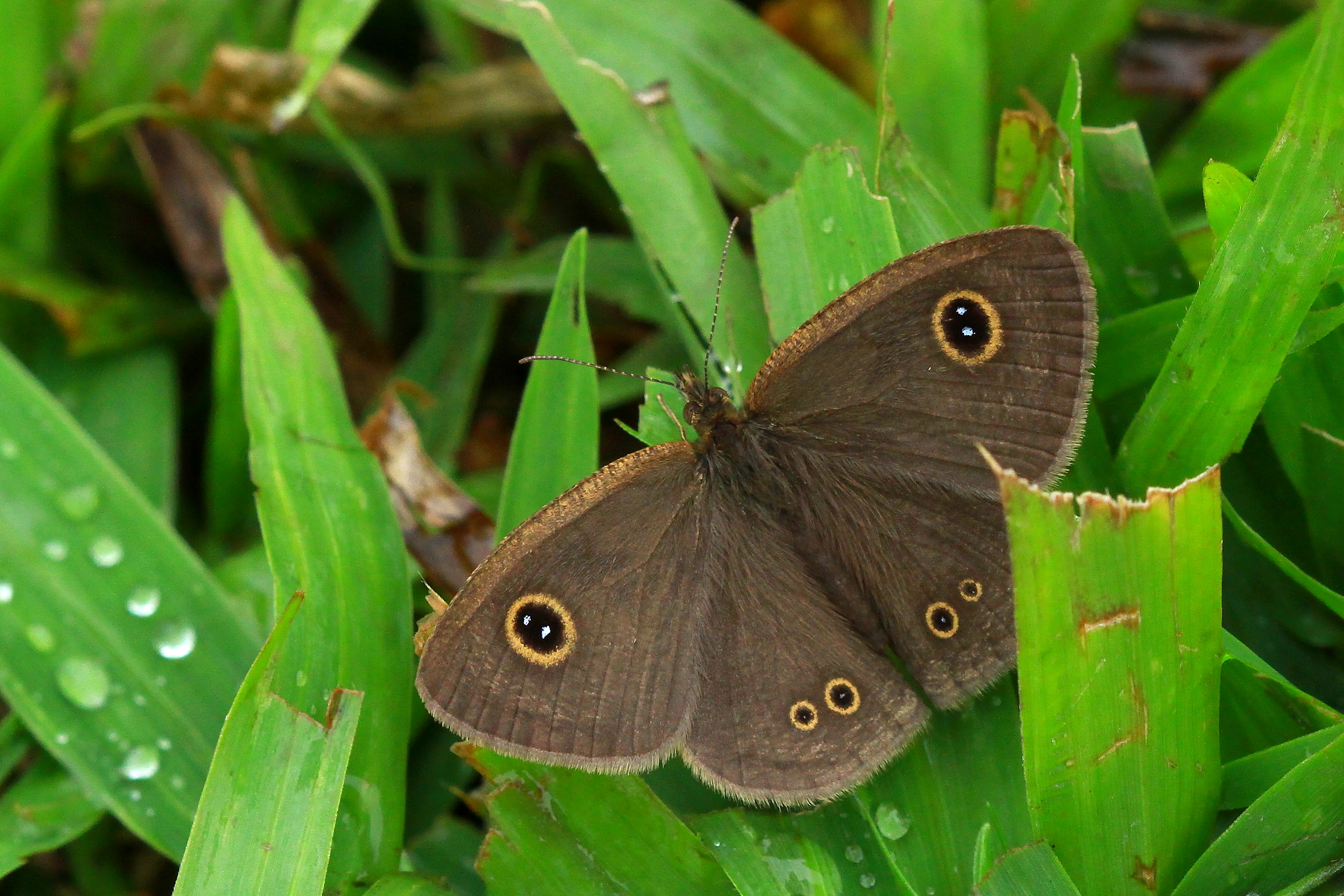
Imago (upper side)

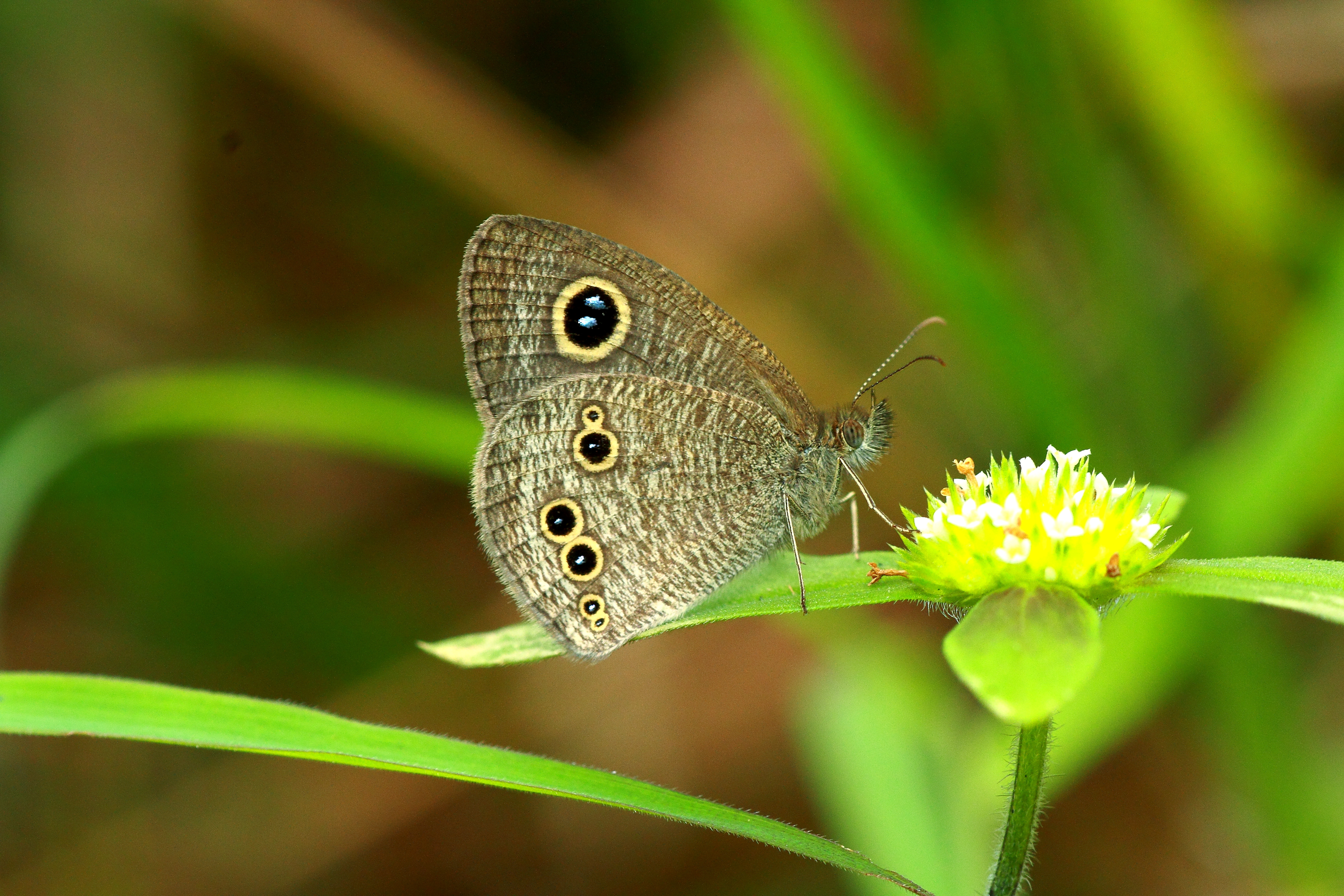
Imago (underside)
