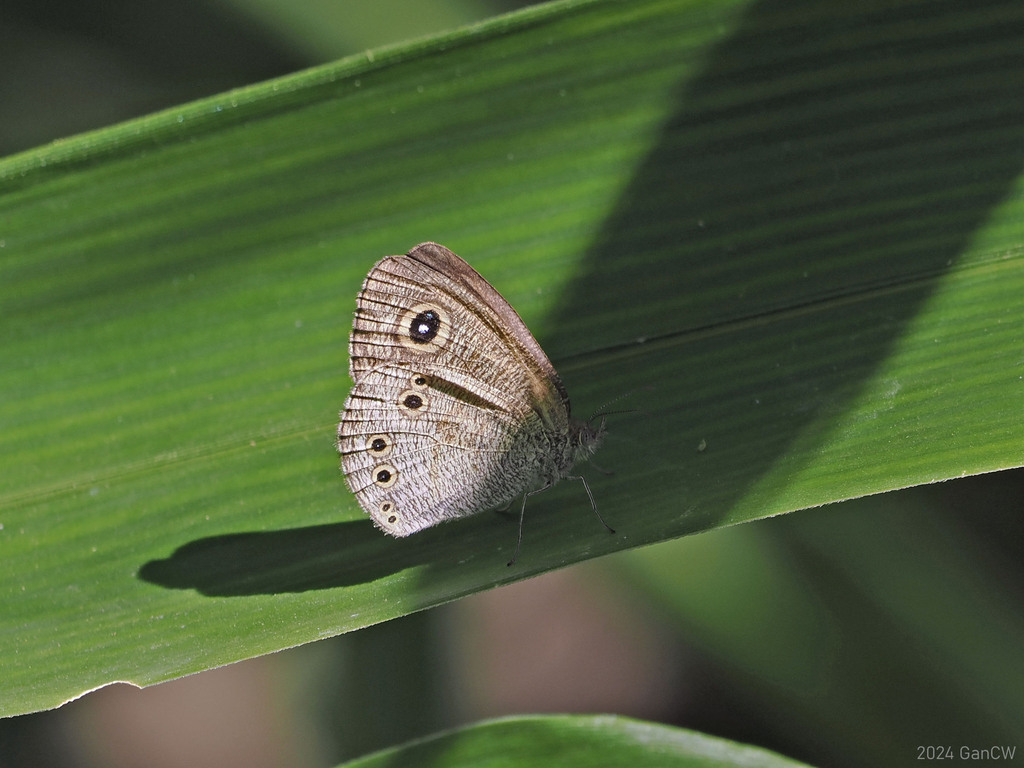

Scientific classification
- Kingdom: Animalia
- Phylum: Arthropoda
- Class: Insecta
- Order: Lepidoptera
- Family: Nymphalidae
- Genus: Ypthima
- Species: Y. philomela

Binomial name
- Ypthima philomela (Linnaeus, 1763)

= Ypthima philomela =

Baby fivering

Species of butterfly

Ypthima philomela, the baby fivering or baby fourring, is a species of Satyrinae butterfly found in Asia.
